Detroit, the largest city in the state of Michigan, was settled in 1701 by French colonists. It is the first European settlement above tidewater in North America.<ref
 name=Riley>, p. 56.</ref> Founded as a New France fur trading post, it began to expand during the 19th century with American settlement around the Great Lakes. By 1920, based on the booming auto industry and immigration, it became a world-class industrial powerhouse and the fourth-largest city in the United States. It held that standing through the mid-20th century.

The first Europeans to settle in Detroit were French country traders and colonists from the New Orleans (the La Louisiane) colony. They were joined by traders from Montreal and Quebec; all had to contend with the powerful Five Nations of the League of the Iroquois (Haudenosaunee), who took control of the southern shores of Lakes Erie and Huron through the Beaver Wars of the 17th century. Also present and powerful, but further to the north, were the Council of Three Fires (Anishinaabe). (in Anishinaabe: Niswi-mishkodewinan, also known as the People of the Three Fires; the Three Fires Confederacy; or the United Nations of Chippewa, Ottawa, and Potawatomi Indians) is a long-standing Anishinaabe alliance of the Ojibwe (or Chippewa), Odawa (or Ottawa), and Potawatomi North American Native tribes. The Three Fires Confederacy (Anishinaabe) were often supported by the French, while the so called League of Iroquois, or Five Nations (Haudenosaunee) was supported by the English and Dutch. 

The region grew initially based on the lucrative inland and Great Lakes connected fur trade, based on continuing relations with influential Native American chiefs and interpreters. The Crown's administration of New France offered free land to colonists to attract families to the region of Detroit. The population grew steadily, but more slowly than in private venture-funded Thirteen Colonies based closer to the Atlantic coast. The French had a smaller population base and attracted fewer families. During the French and Indian War (1756-1763), the French reinforced and improved Fort Detroit (1701) along the Detroit River between 1758–1760. It was subject to repeated attacks by British and colonial forces, strengthened by their Indian allies. 
 
Fort Detroit was surrendered to the British on November 29, 1760, after the fall of Quebec. Control of the area, and all French territory east of the Mississippi River, were formally transferred to Great Britain by the Treaty of Paris after the British defeated France in the Seven Years' War. The official census counted 2,000 people in Detroit in 1760, which dropped to 1,400 by 1773 due to the unattractiveness of living in the fledgling settlement. The city was in territory which the British restricted the colonists from settling in under Royal Proclamation of 1763. It was transferred to Quebec under the Quebec Act of 1774. By 1778 in a census taken during the American Revolution, population was up to 2,144. It was then the third-largest city in the Province of Quebec, after Montreal and Quebec.

After 1773 a steady but growing trickle of European-American settlers took families across the barrier range, or through lower New York State into the Ohio Country—gradually spreading across present-day Ohio along the south shore of Lake Erie and around the bottom of Lake Huron. After the 1778 Sullivan Expedition broke the power of the Iroquois, the New York corridor joined the gaps of the Allegheny, Cumberland Narrows and Cumberland Gap as mountain passes, enabling settlers to pour west into the mid-west, even as the American Revolution wound down.

After the peace, a flood of settlers continued west, and Detroit reaped its share of population, established itself as a gateway to the west and the Great Lakes, and for a time outshone all other cities west of the mountains, save for New Orleans.

During the 19th century, Detroit grew into a thriving hub of commerce and industry. After a devastating fire in 1805, Augustus B. Woodward devised a street plan similar to Pierre Charles L'Enfant's design for Washington, D.C. Monumental avenues and traffic circles were planned to fan out in radial fashion from Campus Martius Park in the heart of the city. This was intended to ease traffic patterns and trees were planted along the boulevards and parks.

The city expanded along Jefferson Avenue, with multiple manufacturing firms taking advantage of the transportation resources afforded by the river and a parallel rail line. In the late 19th century several Gilded Age mansions were built just east of Detroit's current downtown. Detroit was referred to by some as the Paris of the West for its architecture, and for Washington Boulevard, recently electrified by Thomas Edison. Throughout the 20th century, various skyscrapers were built centered on Detroit's downtown.

Following World War II, the auto industry boomed and suburban expansion took place. The Detroit metropolitan area developed as one of the larger geographic areas of the United States. Immigrants and migrants have contributed significantly to Detroit's economy and culture. Later in the century, industrial restructuring and trouble in the auto industry led to a dramatic decline in jobs and population. Since the 1990s, the city has gained increased revitalization. Many areas of the city are listed in the National Register of Historic Places and include National Historic Landmarks.

Native American history

Hearths and geological features from the Holcombe beach site near Lake Saint Clair show that Paleo-Indian people settled in the area of Detroit as early as 11,000 years ago. Mound Builders lived in the area, the largest mound in the area was The Great Mound of the River Rouge, as well as and Springwells and the Fort Wayne Mound Site. Mounds were built for cone-shaped mounds for burial, ceremonial, and defense purposes. The large mound at River Rouge was found to have had very old human bones, arrow heads, chisels, axels, and pottery. The Mound Builders were ancestors to later Native American tribes.

In the 17th century, the region was inhabited by the Huron, Odawa, Potawatomi and western nations of the Iroquois League. The first Europeans did not penetrate into the region and reach the straits of Detroit until French missionaries and traders worked their way around the Iroquois, with whom they were at war in the 1630s. In the late 1600s, raids led by the Five Nations of the Iroquois throughout the region drove out competing native peoples in order to control the fur trade. The French found their permanent villages to be abandoned when they decided to build a fort on the northern bank of the Detroit River.

Early French settlement

The first recorded mention of the site was in the 1670s, when French missionaries found a stone idol venerated by the Native Americans there and destroyed it with an axe. Early settlers planted twelve missionary pear trees "named for the twelve Apostles" on the grounds of what is now Waterworks Park.

The city name comes from the Detroit River, meaning the strait of Lake Erie, linking Lake Huron and Lake Erie; in the historical context, the strait included Lake St. Clair and the St. Clair River.
The sieur de Cadillac in 1698 proposed to his government in Paris that Detroit be established as a shelter for displaced Native American allies. Paris approved and in 1701 Cadillac, with his lieutenant Alphonse de Tonty, led a party of 100 Frenchmen to establish a post called Fort Pontchartrain du Détroit, naming it after his sponsor the comte de Pontchartrain, Minister of Marine under Louis XIV. In 1704, he was given ownership over the strenuous opposition of officials in New France. An investigation by de Pontchartrain showed Cadillac was a tyrannical profiteer whose mischief hurt the French cause, so Cadillac was removed and sent to faraway New Orleans as governor of Louisiana.

Ste. Anne de Détroit, founded 1701, is the second oldest continuously operating Catholic parish in the United States; it was the first building erected in Detroit.

The main business was trading furs with the Native Americans, using goods supplied from Montreal. It was the largest French village between Montreal and New Orleans. Native American villages of rival tribes grew up near the fort which lead to the Fox Wars in the early 1700s.

Francois Marie Picoté, sieur de Belestre, the last French commander at Fort Detroit (1758–1760), surrendered on November 29, 1760 to the British. Control of the area was formally transferred to the British by the 1763 Treaty of Paris. New France was renamed Quebec and the settlement became Detroit. Grants of free land attracted families to Detroit, which grew to 800 people in 1765.

Demonstrating their independent power, several tribes in the region collaborated in Pontiac's Rebellion in 1763; they overran many smaller forts but could not subdue Detroit.

American control

Detroit was the goal of various American campaigns during the Revolutionary War, but logistical difficulties in the American frontier and American Indian allies of Great Britain would keep any armed Patriot force from reaching the Detroit area. In the 1783 Treaty of Paris, Great Britain ceded territory that included Detroit to the newly recognized United States, though in reality it remained under British control. Great Britain continued to trade with and defend her native allies in the area, and supplied local nations with weapons and supplies to raid American settlers and soldiers. The British left in 1796 following the Jay Treaty. In 1794, a Native American alliance, that had received some support and encouragement from the British, was decisively defeated by General Anthony Wayne at the Battle of Fallen Timbers near Toledo, Ohio. Wayne negotiated the Treaty of Greenville (1795) with many of these nations, in which tribes ceded the area of Fort Detroit to the United States.

Father Gabriel Richard arrived at Ste. Anne's in 1796. He helped start the school which evolved into the University of Michigan, started primary schools for American boys and girls as well as for Native Americans, as a territorial representative to U.S. Congress helped establish a road-building project that connected Detroit and Chicago, and brought the first printing press to Michigan which printed the first Michigan newspaper. The Great Fire of 1805 destroyed most of the settlement. A river warehouse and brick chimneys of the wooden homes were the sole structures to survive. Detroit's motto and seal (as on the Flag) reflect this fire.

First incorporation
Detroit was incorporated as a town by the legislature of the Northwest Territory at Chillicothe, Ohio, on January 18, 1802, effective February 1, 1802. Government was administered by a five-person board of trustees and there was no office of mayor. Following this, Ohio became a state and the eastern half of Michigan was attached to the Indiana Territory.

Woodward plan

Before the new territorial government officially began, a fire destroyed nearly all of Detroit on June 11, 1805. The Michigan Territory was established effective June 30, 1805, as a separate territory with Detroit as the capital. The newly appointed governor, William Hull, and the territorial judges (Augustus B. Woodward, Frederick Bates, James Witherell, and John Griffin), constituted the territorial government. They convinced the U.S. Congress to pass an act on April 21, 1806, which authorized them to lay out a town that included all of the old town of Detroit plus an additional 10,000 acres (40 km²) to be used as compensation for persons who lost their house in the fire.

After the fire of 1805, Justice Augustus B. Woodward devised a plan similar to Pierre Charles L'Enfant's design for Washington, D.C. Detroit's monumental avenues and traffic circles fan out in a baroque styled radial fashion from Grand Circus Park in the heart of the city's theater district, which facilitates traffic patterns along the city's tree-lined boulevards and parks. Main thoroughfares radiate outward from the city center like spokes in a wheel.

City incorporation

On September 13, 1806, the territorial government passed an act incorporating the new city of Detroit. The governor appointed Solomon Sibley as mayor. Shortly afterward, Sibley resigned and Elijah Brush was appointed in his stead. The mayor was appointed by the governor and, under the act of incorporation, was able to disapprove legislation passed by the popularly elected council without any recourse for overriding the mayor. Because of this, many felt that the real aim of the governor in incorporating the city was to remove the popularly elected town officers and exert a more direct influence over governance of the city. This form of government was extremely unpopular, and was repealed on February 4, 1809. However, to prevent resurrection of the popularly elected town government, on September 16, 1810, an act passed repealing all laws pertaining to Michigan that had been passed by the Legislature of the Northwest Territory. This effectively eradicated any trace of legitimacy for the former popularly elected town government.

War of 1812

In the War of 1812, Governor Hull surrendered Detroit to a smaller British force supported by a larger force of Native American allies commanded by Tecumseh. The British commander, Isaac Brock, had bluffed the Americans into believing there were thousands of Native American warriors accompanying him. Tecumseh marched his native troops through a clearing and then circled the same troops through the clearing again to make it seem there was a much larger native force. Hull was convicted of cowardice and sentenced to death by a court martial, but received a presidential pardon. The U.S. Army recaptured Detroit in 1813 after the British abandoned it and used it as a base to invade Canada and permanently end the threat of Native American raids on American settlements. After the British abandoned Detroit, American forces caught up to the retreating British-Indian force, and decisively defeated them. Lewis Cass, as territorial governor, on October 24, 1815, restored control of local affairs to the people of Detroit, with the election of a five-person board of trustees and enactment of a charter for the city of Detroit.

Slavery in early Detroit

One piece of the Detroit narrative that is often exempt from the telling of history is that of slavery. Although Detroit, or the North in general, is often perceived to have been abolitionist and free of slavery, slavery indeed played a role in the city's history. Captive indigenous and African people contributed to the early development of the city. It is likely that slaves were among the first group that Cadillac brought to settle Detroit in 1701 and that their labor was used to plant the first crops. Slave labor was crucial for the city's construction, black slaves provided the labor for the fur trade, and indigenous women were exploited for sex.

From Detroit's establishment to Michigan's gain of statehood, the ownership of slaves was dynamic. Slaveholders included merchants, farmers, political leaders, priests, and others who held power within the society.

Partly due to the inadequate documentation, the story of slavery in Detroit is incomplete and unknown by many. There is nearly no record of the direct words of Detroit slaves, but there are some surviving records of slavery in the journals, wills, and finance accounts of slaveholders. Few scholarly works have been written about the role slavery played in Detroit, and Michigan has not produced any full-length narratives of slavery.

A city emerges

Government under the board of trustees continued until an act of the Territorial Legislature on August 5, 1824, created a Common Council of the City of Detroit. The Council consisted of five aldermen, the mayor, and the recorder. In an act of April 4, 1827, the number of aldermen increased to seven. In 1839, it increased to 14: two aldermen from six wards plus the mayor and recorder. A seventh ward was created in 1848, an eighth in 1849, and the ninth and tenth wards in 1857. Also in 1857, a new city charter provided that the mayor and recorder would no longer sit as members of the council. At this time, the council consisted of 20 members, two aldermen from ten wards. In 1873, a twelfth ward was added and aldermen from an illegally constituted eleventh ward also temporarily sat on the council. In 1875, a properly constituted eleventh ward and a thirteenth ward were added. The city charter of 1883 changed the name of the body to the Board of Aldermen. A few years earlier in 1881, a separately elected ten-person body named Board of Councilmen (also called the City Council), was established. This body was abolished in 1887.

After Detroit rebuilt in the early 19th century, a thriving community soon sprang up, and by the Civil War, over 45,000 people were living in the city, primarily spread along Jefferson Avenue to the east and Fort Street to the west. As in many major American cities, subsequent redevelopment of the central city through the next 150 years has eliminated all but a handful of the antebellum structures in Detroit. The oldest remaining structures are those built as private residences, including a group in the Corktown neighborhood and another set of houses strung along Jefferson Avenue — notably the Charles Trowbridge House (1826), (the oldest known structure in the city), the Joseph Campau House (1835), the Sibley House (1848), the Beaubien House (1851), and the Moross House (1855). Other extant pre-1860 structures include Fort Wayne (1849); Saints Peter and Paul Church (1848) and Mariner's Church (1849); and early commercial buildings such as those in the Randolph Street Commercial Buildings Historic District, for example.

The main communication medium from the 1830s until the rise of television in the 1950s was the newspaper. Detroit had a large variety of daily papers, meeting the needs of the political parties have different language groups in the city, as well as the needs of readers concerned with news of business, labor, agriculture, literature, local churches, and polite society.

Civil War era 
Prior to the American Civil War, the city's access to the Canada–US border made it a key stop for runaway slaves along the underground railroad. The Michigan Soldiers' and Sailors' Monument in Detroit's Campus Martius Park commemorates the state's role in the American Civil War. Thousands of Detroiters formed volunteer regiments, including the 24th Michigan Volunteer Infantry Regiment (part of the legendary Iron Brigade) which fought with distinction and suffered 82% casualties at Gettysburg in 1863. Abraham Lincoln is quoted as saying Thank God for Michigan! Following Lincoln's assassination, General George Armstrong Custer delivered a eulogy to the thousands gathered near Campus Martius Park. Custer led the Michigan Brigade during the American Civil War and called them the Wolverines.

The Detroit race riot of 1863 occurred on March 6, 1863, and was the city's first such incident, as Irish and German Catholics resisted the mandatory draft laws. At the time, it was reported as "the bloodiest day that ever dawned upon Detroit". The casualties of the day included at least two people dead, and many others injured, mostly African-American, 35 buildings were burned to the ground, and a number of other buildings were damaged by fire.

Rise of industry and commerce

Detroit's central location in the Great Lakes Region has contributed to its status as a major center for commerce and global trade. As Detroit grew, it emerged as a U.S. transportation hub linking the Great Lakes system of waterways to the Erie Canal and to rail lines. Pharmaceutical firms such as Parke-Davis in the 1870s and the Frederick Stearns Company in the 1890s established centers between East Jefferson Avenue. Globe Tobacco built a manufacturing facility closer to downtown in 1888. During the late 19th century, cast-iron stove manufacturing became Detroit's top industry; by the 1890s, the city became known as the "Stove Capital of the World".

The rise of manufacturing led to a new class of wealthy industrialists, entrepreneurs, and professionals. Some of these nouveau riche built along East Jefferson, resulting in structures such as the Thomas A. Parker House (1868), the Croul-Palms House (1881), the William H. Wells House (1889), the John N. Bagley House (1889), and the Frederick K. Stearns House (1902).

Detroit began increasingly to expand, and other citizens pushed north of downtown, building houses along Woodward in what was at the time a quiet residential area. The city has many restored historic Victorian structures, notably those in the Brush Park and East Ferry Avenue historic districts. The Elisha Taylor House (1870) and the Hudson–Evans House (1872) are both in Brush Park; the Col. Frank J. Hecker House (1888) and the Charles Lang Freer House (1887) are in the East Ferry Avenue neighborhood. Near the end of the 19th century, apartment living became more acceptable for affluent middle-class families, and upscale apartments, such as the Coronado Apartments (1894), the Verona Apartments (1894), the Palms Apartments (1903), the Davenport Apartments (1905) in the Cass-Davenport Historic District, and the Garden Court Apartments (1915) were constructed to meet the new demand.

These well-to-do late-19th-century residents also funded the construction of a spate of churches, such as the Cass Avenue Methodist Episcopal Church (1883), the First Presbyterian Church (1889), the Trinity Episcopal Church (1890) (built by James E. Scripps), and the First Unitarian Church (1890).

Immigrants in the 19th century

Detroit has long been a city of immigrants, from the early French settlers in the 17th and 18th century, through the Irish emigrants who settled in the Corktown neighborhood in the 1840s, and the Germans who comprised the largest group. Significant contingents during this period included German and Polish immigrants who settled in Detroit in the 1860-1890s.

Conditions were especially favorable for the Irish Catholics. Vinyard finds that they enjoyed many opportunities and suffered "negligible religious prejudice". They were especially successful in politics, government service, dockyard and construction jobs, and built numerous churches. They funded the migration of relatives from Ireland. They took very active leadership roles in the Democratic Party and labor unions

European immigrants opened businesses and established communities. German immigrants established German-speaking churches, primarily on the east side of the city, including Saint John's-St. Luke's Evangelical Church (1872), St. Joseph Catholic Church (1873), and Sacred Heart Church (1875), as well as social clubs such as the Harmonie Club (1894) and west-side churches such as St. Boniface (1882) and Gethsemane Evangelical Lutheran Church (1891).

Close behind, a wave of Polish immigrants established east-side Roman Catholic parishes such as St. Albertus (1885), Sweetest Heart Of Mary (1893), St. Josaphat's (1901), St. Stanislaus (1911), and St. Thomas the Apostle Catholic Church (1923). The Poles also settled on the west side, founding West Side Dom Polski (1916). The son of Prussian Polish immigrants, Rev. John A. Lemke, born in Detroit on February 10, 1866, was the first American-born Roman Catholic priest of Polish descent to be ordained in America. He was baptized at St. Mary Roman Catholic Church (1843), at the corner of St. Antoine and Croghan (Monroe), on February 18, 1866, attended St. Albertus for his primary education, and studied at Detroit College which is now the University of Detroit Mercy where he received a bachelor's degree in 1884; then, after attending St. Mary's in Baltimore, he completed his theological studies at St. Francis Seminary in Monroe, Michigan, and he was ordained by the Bishop John Samuel Foley in 1889. The Catholics were especially energetic in building churches, schools, orphanages, hospitals and other charitable institutions.

Nearly nine out of ten Detroiters in 1900 (87%) lived in single-family homes. European immigrants including German, Belgian, Polish, and Irish ethnics were likely to be home owners in the city. Most immigrants built their own home with the aid of their neighbors, or if still saving the purchase price they rented from fellow ethnics. They used an informal, localized, ethnically controlled housing market that was quite distinct from the professionally operated housing market. Homeownership in Detroit surged in the city's immigrant neighborhoods by 1900.

Hazen Pingree 

In 1887, John Pridgeon Jr., a Democrat, was elected mayor in a landslide after his Republican opponent endorsed prohibition in the heavily German city. Pridgeon's term was besmirched by multiple scandals involving the Common Council, city commissioners, grand jury investigations, and multiple indictments for bribery and graft. In 1889, Republicans recouped and called for "good government" by nominating a businessman with no political experience, Hazen S. Pingree after a colorful campaign in which Pingree revealed his tolerance by making a circuit of saloons. One of his early projects was simply paving the streets—only four streets were paved, and The Detroit Journal described the rest as "150 miles of rotting, rutted, lumpy, dilapidated paving". In hot weather some stretches oozed pitch and resin and occasionally caught fire from discarded cigar butts. Warning repeatedly against the dangers of government by the corporations, he launched nationally visible crusades against Detroit's streetcar, gas, electric, and telephone companies. He successfully forced rate reductions that won him widespread popularity. He won public approval for a citizen-owned electric light plant, and became a national spokesman for municipal ownership and close regulation of utilities and street railways. When the nationwide Panic of 1893 pushed the nation into a deep depression (1893–97), he won approval by opening empty lots to garden farming – people called them "Pingree's potato patches". He was a steadfast Republican, and had nothing to do with the Populist Party that had considerable support among labor union members. Pingree added to the old stock Yankee Republican base by making large inroads into the German, Polish and Canadian elements. He was reelected in 1891, 1893 and 1895. Pingree was one of the most influential American mayors in the 1890s – historians now rated him number 4 among all American mayors, and see him as one of the early leaders of the Progressive Era. He supported the gold standard in 1896, and worked hard to carry the city and state for William McKinley over silverite William Jennings Bryan in the intensely competitive 1896 presidential election. McKinley carried the city and state and Pingree was elected governor of Michigan.

20th century

Henry Ford and the automobile industry

Henry Ford revolutionized the automobile industry when he virtually created the assembly line at his Highland Park Plant in 1910. His innovation transformed mass production and catalyzed Detroit's growth and industrialization. Around the start of the 20th century, entrepreneurs in the Detroit area capitalized on the already-existing machine tool and coach-building industry in the city to forge into the production of automobiles. Detroit's central geographic location and access to the Great Lakes and railways gave automobile producers easy access to capital and markets, making Detroit an ideal site for many automobile manufacturers' headquarters. As Ford's rivals quickly adopted his manufacturing techniques, the automobile industry flourished and essentially elevated Detroit from a second-tier industrial city to a world-class city. Thus, Detroit earned its famous nickname, the Motor City.

At the turn of the 20th century, no one industry was dominant in Detroit. Early automotive production, which was still a relatively small industry at the time, is evidenced by structures such as the Ford Piquette Avenue Plant (1904) (a National Historic Landmark), and multiple structures in the surrounding Piquette Avenue Industrial Historic District (including the now-destroyed E-M-F/Studebaker Plant, 1906) and the New Amsterdam Historic District (including the original Cadillac factory, 1905) and small factories such as the Crescent Brass and Pin Company Building (1905). Then as automobile assembly and associated manufacturing came to dominate Detroit over the next thirty years, the newly minted automotive magnates built commercial and office buildings such as General Motors Building (1919), the General Motors Research Laboratory (1928), and the Fisher Building (1928).

In 1914, Ford revolutionized labor relations when he announced he would pay workers in his plants five dollars a day— about double the going rate at rival firms. In addition to attracting the best workers in Detroit, Ford's high wage policy effectively stopped the massive turnover rate, raised productivity, lowered overall labor costs and helped to propel the Model T to industry dominance. By the 1920s, however, Ford's formula of cheap cars with few options fell behind General Motors, which emphasized upscale quality and variety, and provided financing for car buyers. Labor relations in the automobile industry transformed again in 1935 when the United Auto Workers labor union was founded in Detroit.

The rapid growth of the automobile industry led to rising demands for labor. Immigrants from Europe initially filled much of the labor demand, but restrictive immigration acts in 1921 and 1924 caused a dramatic reduction in the supply of foreign-born workers to the United States. Meanwhile, the automobile industry was growing exponentially. Beginning during World War I, Ford began hiring African Americans to close the labor shortage. At this time, the hardships of life in the Jim Crow South and the promise of manufacturing jobs in the North brought African Americans to Detroit in large numbers in the Great Migration. This massive influx of workers and their families caused Detroit's population to soar from 265,000 to 1.5 million between 1900 and 1930 and pushed the city's boundaries outward. The population boom led to a severe housing shortage and the construction of public housing aimed at middle-class auto workers.

The rise of the automobile also required rethinking transportation within the city. The Chestnut Street-Grand Trunk Railroad bridge (1929) was a result of a grade separation that unsnarled train and automobile traffic. The Fort Street-Pleasant Street and Norfolk & Western Railroad Viaduct (1928) was a product of the same program, routing trucking traffic over the train traffic, and the West Jefferson Avenue-Rouge River Bridge (1922) allowed the Rouge River to be expanded for barge traffic.

Progressive movement

Progressivism was energized starting in the 1890s by upper-middle-class men and women who felt a civic duty to uplift society by "freeing" it from the tyranny of corrupt politicians who worked hand in hand with unscrupulous saloonkeepers. The most prominent leader was Republican Mayor Hazen S. Pingree. A representative community leader was automaker Henry M. Leland of the Detroit Citizens League. Supported by Detroit's business, professional, and Protestant religious communities, the League campaigned for a new city charter, an anti-saloon ordinance, and the open shop whereby a worker could get a job even if he did not belong to a labor union.

Reinhold Niebuhr, a German-American Protestant minister became nationally famous as a Detroit minister who attacked the KKK, which was strong among white Protestants in the city. In an era when Henry Ford was an American icon, Niebuhr attracted national attention by criticizing the auto industry. He preached the Social Gospel, attacking what he considered the brutalization and insecurity of Ford workers. Niebuhr had moved to the left and was troubled by the demoralizing effects of industrialism on workers. He became an outspoken critic of Ford and allowed union organizers to use his pulpit to expound their message of workers' rights. Niebuhr attacked poor conditions created by the assembly lines and erratic employment practices.

Niebuhr rejected the prevailing optimism that prevailed in the 1920s. He wrote in his diary:

We went through one of the big automobile factories to-day ...The foundry interested me particularly. The heat was terrific. The men seemed weary. Here manual labor is a drudgery and toil is slavery. The men cannot possibly find any satisfaction in their work. They simply work to make a living. Their sweat and their dull pain are part of the price paid for the fine cars we all run. And most of us run the cars without knowing what price is being paid for them. ... We are all responsible. We all want the things which the factory produces and none of us is sensitive enough to care how much in human values the efficiency of the modern factory costs.

The historian Ronald H. Stone thinks that Niebuhr never talked to the assembly line workers (many of his parishioners were skilled craftsmen) but projected feelings onto them after discussions with Rev. Samuel Marquis. As some studies of assembly line workers have shown, the work may have been dull, but workers had complex motivations and could find ways to make meaning of their experiences; many boasted about their jobs and tried hard to place their sons on the assembly line. Ford tried but failed to control work habits.

Sociologists who interviewed workers concluded that they were more interested in controlling their home lives than their work lives. The Ford solution was welfare capitalism, paying relatively high wages with added benefits, such as vacations and retirement, that reduced turnover and appealed primarily to family men. Link and Link conclude that by tying half a man's wages to the company's profit, Ford managers offered "a highly successful wage incentive plan that simultaneously increased job satisfaction and raised the productivity of labor".

Gilded Age

At the beginning of the 20th century, historic Gilded Age areas such as Brush Park gave rise to even more upscale neighborhoods, including the Boston-Edison, Indian Village, and Palmer Woods. Woodward Avenue neighborhoods (such as the Warren-Prentis Historic District and the Willis-Selden Historic District) became mixed with apartments and commercial buildings. Many architecturally and historically significant churches and cathedrals arose during this period throughout the city's neighborhoods.

Automobile wealth along with educational & technological advancements led to a boom in downtown Detroit business, and the construction of a collection of early 20th century skyscrapers. The most notable of these are the Art Deco National Historic Landmark Guardian Building (1928) and The Fisher Building (1928). Many renowned architects including Albert Kahn, Wirt C. Rowland, and others designed and built a number of the cities skyscrapers and landmarks.

Shopping districts sprang up along Park Avenue, Broadway, and Woodward. In 1881, Joseph Lowthian Hudson opened a small men's clothing store in Detroit. After 10 years he had 8 stores in the midwest and was the most profitable clothing retailer in the country. In 1893, he began construction of J. L. Hudson Department Store at Gratiot and Farmer streets in Detroit. The store grew over the years and a 25-story tower was added in 1928. The final section was a 12-story addition in 1946, giving the entire complex  of floor space.

Multiple hotels were constructed, including the Fort Shelby Hotel (1916), the Detroit-Leland Hotel (1927), the Royal Palm Hotel (1924), and several others.

Extravagant movie palaces such as the Fox (1928) and the Palms (1925) entertained thousands every day. Public buildings, such as Orchestra Hall (1919), the Detroit Public Library (1921), and the Detroit Institute of Arts (1923) were inspired by the City Beautiful Movement.

Immigrants in the 20th century

The development of the automobile industry did more than create a significant increase in Detroit's industrial production. It also changed the demographics of the city by attracting large waves of immigrants from Europe and Canada and black migrants from the South to fill the rising demands for labor. These people, who increased the city's population during the early 1900s, did not just affect the expanding automobile industry; they also transformed neighborhoods by defining certain areas and bringing jobs and money into the local community. Although many people began to pile into Detroit, Thomas Sugrue, author of "The Origins of the Urban Crisis", suggests, "Beginning in the 1920s--and certainly by the 1940s--class and race became more important than ethnicity as a guide to the city's residential geography."

An early wave of immigrants came from Greece in the late 1890s; it peaked from 1910–14. These Greek peasants turned their understanding of supply and demand into thriving businesses as peddlers, grocers, and restaurateurs. Just as they lived in villages in Greece, so did they settle in a new "village" in Detroit known as Greektown. The Greek immigrants retained their native regionalism and factionalism by splitting their Detroit neighborhood into numerous sub-groups. With Americanization, however, the patriarchal culture diminished, although most families remained connected to the Greek Orthodox Church.

Like the Greeks, Italians began to settle in Detroit from 1890–1914. While most of these immigrants came from Europe and Canada, thereby blending in with the Caucasian residents already living in the city. Like American blacks, the Italian immigrants faced economic and social discrimination.

By 1914, Jews from Eastern Europe added to the already diverse demographics of Detroit. These new immigrants increased the established German Jewish community to about 34,000 people. Although the relationship between the wealthier, more Americanized German Jews and the poorer, less integrated immigrants tended to be a tense one, anti-Semitism was not an issue. Sugrue explains this by claiming, "Residents of Detroit's white neighborhoods abandoned their ethnic affiliations and found a new identity in their whiteness" (Sugrue 22). Skin color, therefore, became more important than religious belief in the Americanization process.

African Americans—many of whom had migrated from the South to Detroit when jobs opened up during World War II—suffered the most. According to Sugrue, "Black Detroit in 1940 was large and rapidly growing" (Sugrue 23). The residents in Detroit's sizable "black ghetto" often found themselves in dilapidated houses that served as homes for multiple families. African Americans, who were spatially segregated from whites, lived in overcrowded and poorly maintained places like Paradise Valley (Sugrue 23–4, 36). As the community changed, only a handful managed to relocate to the northern part of the city near the Eight Mile/Wyoming area; a selected few succeeded in finding homes in Conant Gardens. Wherever the location, black neighborhoods remained crowded, a result of the Great Migration of blacks to the city.

The rise in the black population mirrored the overall increase in the population of Detroit. Between 1900 and 1930, the number of people in the city grew from 265,000 to more than 1.5 million residents. Polish immigrants contributed to this population surge, becoming in the 1930s a large immigrant group totaling more than 66,000.

The Depression, followed by World War II, further diversified the city. Because political situations made it difficult to leave Europe during this time period, most of the new arrivals to Detroit came from within the United States: whites from Appalachia and blacks from the rural South. Sugrue notes that African Americans comprised more than a quarter of the city's residents by 1960. After 1970, political tensions in the Middle East motivated Arabs, especially Palestinians, to also migrate to Detroit. These immigrants primarily relocated in Dearborn, an area that continues to remain an Arab center in the middle of Detroit.

Not only did Detroit increase in population during the twentieth century, but it also grew in geographic size. It expanded its borders exponentially by annexing all or part of the incorporated villages of Woodmere (1905), Delray (1905), Fairview (1907), St. Clair Heights (1918), and Warrendale (1925), as well as thousands of acres of land in the surrounding townships. Yet, areas such as Hamtramck and Highland Park maintained their status as legally separate cities within the larger metropolis of Detroit. 
Detroit, therefore, owes a great deal of its growth to the auto industry. The promise of jobs attracted immigrants from Europe, Asia, and the United States to settle in the Motor City. Originally defined by tightly knit ethnic clusters, the neighborhoods soon began to disperse. As Thomas Sugrue states, "Fewer and fewer white neighborhoods were ethnically homogeneous." Although Detroit remains a large urban center today, it has lost much of its diversity to the suburbs. As a result, the remaining citizens of Detroit—primarily blacks—now face social and economic challenges that prevent them from enjoying lives of quality.

Local politics
Local politics from the 1870 to the 1910s had been influenced by prominent ethnic communities, especially German Americans and Irish Catholics who controlled the Democratic Party. This changed after 1910 as the old-stock Protestant business leaders, especially from the automobile industry, led a Progressive Era crusade for efficiency, and elected their own men to office, typified by James J. Couzens (mayor, 1919–22, US Senator, 1922–36). The critical change took place in 1918 when the voters changed the Common Council from a 42-man body elected on a partisan basis from 21 wards, to a nine-man unit, elected on a non-partisan basis from the city at-large. The ethnics (especially the Germans) and the Democrats lost their political base. After 1930, however, the Democratic party rebuilt its strength, formed an alliance with the United Auto Workers union and restored the leadership of the ethnics, as typified by Frank Murphy (mayor 1930–33, governor 1937-39). Mayors Jerome Cavanagh (1962–70) and Roman Gribbs (1970-74) were the last of the white ethnic mayors, until 2014. The election of Coleman Young (1974–93) as mayor in 1974 brought to power a new generation of black leaders who represented the city's new majority.

Women in the 20th century

Most young women took jobs before marriage, then quit. Before the growth of high schools after 1900, most women left school after the 8th grade at about age 15. Ciani (2005) shows that type of work they did reflected their ethnicity and marital status. Black mothers were often day labors, usually as domestic servants, because other opportunities were limited. Most mothers receiving pensions were white and sought work only when necessary.

Nursing became professionalized in the late 19th century, opening a new middle-class career for talented young women of all social backgrounds. The School of Nursing at Detroit's Harper Hospital, begun in 1884, was a national leader. Its graduates worked at the hospital and also in institutions, public health services, as private duty nurses, and volunteered for duty at military hospitals during the Spanish–American War and the two world wars.

In the early 20th century, the middle-class women of the Detroit Federation of Women's Clubs' (DFWC) promoted civic mindedness within the context of traditional gender roles. Most of them were married to prominent business and professional leaders. Issues of public health, sanitation, and public safety were of vital concern to all families. The DFWC pressured city leaders to provide adequate education and sanitation facilities, safe food handling, and traffic safety. They did not form coalitions with working class or ethnic women, nor labor unions. A Women's Citizens League was established and led by Lucia Voorhees Grimes.

World War II spurred the transition toward women holding a more active role in society. As more men enlisted, women were expected to take up their mantle in factories, defense industries and American businesses. In fact, an increasing number of women became their family's main breadwinner; social campaigns like the infamous "Rosie the Riveter" further reinforced the idea of an independent working women.

Despite these circumstances, the stereotypical image of women in society was hard-pressed to change. Alhough women were granted more opportunities of employment, they were still continuously shut out of traditionally male-dominated roles, including metalwork, chemicals, tool-making, steel, and construction. This is ironic, considering Detroit was a production hub during the war—its many automotive factories were continuously churning out tanks, air crafts, and weapons. These gender-based restrictions limited the types of jobs women could hold, which led many women to work entry-level jobs in assembly lines where they were not expected, nor authorized to partake in more physical tasks. Because women could not participate in these more grueling tasks, employers used this as an excuse to under-pay them, and restrict their benefits. Women were still expected to be responsible for house-work and childcare, making it difficult for them to work the longer hours, and resulted in high rates of absenteeism, leaving them with an unsteady source of income. This created a vicious cycle, where women were simultaneously expected to take on the role of the "man of the house", while not being given the same opportunities males were. The on-going tug-of-war between country and family left many women in a limbo, where they could not safely rely on their work to afford supporting their children.

African American women were especially discriminated against on the basis of both their race and sex. Many firms and factories prioritized white women, leading to African American women working in more dangerous environments where they were often harassed by their white male co-workers. In 1943, out of the 50 war production plants in Detroit that hired women, only 19 allowed African American women to work. Due to these restrictions, only 20% of African American women had a job by 1950, leaving many of their families searching for domestic or short-term stints to afford housing and food.

It is often said that women "gained more rights" during World War II. While it is true that women were encouraged to take a more proactive position in society, they were still faced with many barriers—especially women of color. It is difficult to raise an entire family with the number of job restrictions and lack of employment opportunities that women experienced. When their husbands and white men specifically, returned from war, they were often given their previously held employment positions, leaving newly-widowed women to search elsewhere for any work.

Great Depression

After the 1928 presidential campaign of Catholic Al Smith, the Democrats mobilize large number of Polish and other Catholic ethnics to make their comeback. Although the election for mayor was nonpartisan, the Democrats rallied behind Judge Frank Murphy, who served as mayor 1930–33. The Great Depression was devastating for Detroit, as sales of automobiles plunged and there were large-scale layoffs at all industrial enterprises. Murphy insisted that no one would go hungry, and set up the Mayor's Unemployment Committee that set up relief soup kitchens and potato gardens. In 1933, Murphy resigned, and Frank Couzens was elected mayor, serving until 1938. He was the son of Republican U.S. Senator James Couzens, who had been mayor in 1919–22. In 1933, the city was in a financial crisis, as tax receipts had plunged and welfare spending had skyrocketed. The city had defaulted on its bond payments and had to use promissory notes (" script") to pay teachers, policemen and other employees. Couzens restored the city's financial credibility by cutting the debt and balancing the budget. He obtained large sums of federal relief money, and upgraded the street-lighting program and the sewage system.

Labor unions
As Detroit become more industrialized, workers banded together to establish labor unions, such as the United Auto Workers in 1940. These unions settled wage, time, and benefit disputes with manufacturers. Though labor unions were less powerful than the manufacturers themselves, they shaped much of the development of Detroit's labor market, especially during World War II. Over 50% of Detroit's laborers belonged to a union by 1950, which in theory increased their image as "one unified body" from a manufacturer's perspective. With so many employees involved in unions, manufacturers were more prone to listening to their demands, which established a good working relationship between both parties, and led to "economic security and employment stability" for unionized laborers.

Despite these benefits, however, labor unions were less beneficial toward people of color, especially African Americans. Their decisions often allowed, or even reinforced, discriminatory hiring practices by prioritizing white males compared to African American workers. They rarely vouched for African Americans in management positions, leading to most hired African Americans working entry-level positions for years. This created a long-standing falsified reputation of African Americans in the industrial sector: since few were given the opportunity to be in management positions, employers automatically—and wrongly—assumed they did not deserve to be.

Like most things, labor unions showcased both the positives and negatives of Detroit's history. They were created to grant more transparency between workers and their employers, but only reinforced the socio-economic divide between white workers and workers of color. Over time, however, the role of the union has become more diversified. In the later years of the Great Depression, unions like the United Auto Workers partnered with African American churches and civil rights organizations like the NAACP to integrate African American workers into the benefits that other workers already received. They increased African American membership, vouched for more civil rights in the workforce, and are a large reason for the increase in African American employment during World War II, when factories and manufacturers were in need of more workers. In fact, labor activism during the later 20th century increased influence of union leaders in the city such as Jimmy Hoffa of the Teamsters and Walter Reuther of the autoworkers.

The unionization process in autos was led by CIO organizers. The strongest response came not from semi-skilled assembly line men, but from the militant leadership of skilled tool and die makers of Irish ethnicity. They had been complacent during the late 1920s but reacted with extreme militancy to the hardships of the depression. Following the success of the sit down strikes at General Motors, non-unionized, semi-skilled workers followed suit in numerous plants in 1937. They were supported by the pro-union mood of the city, the New Deal's permissive political climate, and Governor Frank Murphy's pro-labor sympathies. They won many concessions and formed numerous locals outside the auto industry. Ford, however, successfully resisted unions until 1941.

World War II and the "Arsenal of Democracy" 

The entry of the United States into World War II brought tremendous changes to the city. From 1942 to 1945, production of commercial automobiles in the city ceased entirely, as its factories were used instead to construct M5 tanks, jeeps, and B-24 bombers for the Allies. The Guardian Building was converted into a headquarters for wartime production. The city made a major contribution to the Allied war effort as part of America's Arsenal of Democracy. Historians note that this accolade was "easily and often corrupted to 'arsehole'" by tired Detroiters waiting in lines everywhere. The government believed that Detroit was vulnerable to air attack, and encouraged companies to diversify production to outside the region.

The B-24 Liberator, the most produced bomber in history, was used to bomb Germany heavily. Before the war, the aviation industry could produce, optimally, one such plane a day at an aircraft plant. By 1943, Ford's plants managed to produce one B-24 an hour at a peak of 600 per month in 24-hour shifts. Many pilots slept on cots waiting for takeoff as the B-24 rolled off the assembly line at Ford's Willow Run facility.

Detroit's wartime manufacturing boom coincided with the decline of Southern agriculture, attracting hundreds of thousands of Southern Blacks to the city in search of economic security and freedom from racist Jim Crow laws. The ongoing draft pillaged Detroit's industrial labor supply, leaving a labor shortage so dire that former auto plants had no choice but to hire Black workers. According to a 1944 report, "a 44% advance in wartime employment brought with it an advance of 103% in the total number of Negroes employed".

As Detroit's Black population continued to increase, housing options grew distressingly scarce. Unscrupulous landlords took advantage of the influx of Black workers and limited housing supply, gouging monthly rent prices in Black neighborhoods. In some cases, Black tenants paid "20 to 40 percent more for rent than whites in equivalent apartments". Spending the majority of their meager wages on rent, Blacks had no disposable income left to afford the upkeep and repair of their rental properties. Lacking maintenance, the decrepit homes of Black neighborhoods turned substandard: grossly congested, lacking water and ventilation, infested with vermin, and prone to fires. White homeowners attributed Black poverty to "individual moral deficiencies", strengthening their collective desire to preserve segregation.

President Roosevelt's New Deal tried to alleviate the housing crisis by simultaneously subsidizing the construction of public housing and private, single-family homes. Working-class whites staunchly opposed public housing, claiming that it jeopardized the construction of new homes and disturbed the "racial and architectural homogeneity" of their neighborhoods. The anti public-housing movement appropriated World War II rhetoric to denounce public housing as a communist conspiracy, a catalyst of racial struggle that would "destroy traditional American values". Too poor to join the cohorts of whites fleeing to racially-homogenous suburbs, working-class whites banded together to terrorize Blacks out of their neighborhoods. In 1941, the Detroit Housing Commission announced the construction of the Sojourner Truth housing project in the Seven-Mile Fenelon neighborhood. Months of protest by the Seven Mile-Fenelon Improvement Association climaxed on February 28, 1942, the day the first black families moved into the project. A vicious race riot resulted in 40 injuries and 220 arrests, the majority of which were black. Seven years later, Mayor Albert Cobo announced he was "putting brakes on all public housing development outside of heavily black inner-city neighborhoods" much to the delight of the white voters who elected him.

Although President Roosevelt's promise of private homeownership was meant to extend to Blacks, local implementation of housing policy further solidified the ghettoization of Black neighborhoods.  The Home Owners' Loan Corporation (HOLC) subsidized "home purchases and improvements with low-interest loans" in order to "protect homeownership from foreclosure". The appraisal practices of HOLC agents, which determined eligibility for subsidized loans and mortgages, excluded Blacks from private homeownership through the structurally racist process of redlining. Racially restrictive housing covenants further limited housing options for Black people, even after the 1948 Supreme Court case Shelley vs Kraemer reversed the legality of such covenants.

During World War II, Detroit became a center of industry, largely due to its innovative roots. The treatment of African Americans during World War II, however, represented the duality between an increase in labor and a decrease in the standard of living. The United States preached the gospel of freedom and human rights abroad while discriminatory federal policy, executed by a racist city government, robbed Black Detroiters of safe and affordable housing. Racial animosity over limited housing only mounted as veterans returned home from the war, boiling over in the riot-ridden 1950s and 1960s.

Postwar era

In economic terms, the postwar years 1945-70 brought high levels of prosperity as the automobile industry had its most prosperous quarter-century.

Although Detroit had a Rapid Transit Commission, it was not popular with the politicians or the public after the strikes of 1946 ended and automobile production resumed. People demanded cars so they could commute from work to spacious houses surrounded by grass instead of riding the trolley to cramped upstairs apartments. During the war, three expressways were built to support the region's war industries. Furthermore, the wartime model of federal, state, and local governments jointly planning and funding expressways gave a successful model for planning and financing more highways. Progress was slow from 1945 to 1947 because of inflation, steel shortages, and the difficulty of building in built-up areas. by the early 1950s highways were in place, and plans were underway to make Detroit a central hub in the forthcoming Interstate Highway System. The new highways had a funding advantage over mass transit because of the availability of federal highway monies coupled with the availability of matching state money. Ultimately, they were paid for by gasoline taxes, which commuters seldom grumbled about.

Other sources indicate the replacement of Detroit's large electric streetcar network with buses and highways was much more controversial. In 1930, Detroit had 30 electric streetcar lines over 534 miles of track. In 1941, a streetcar ran on Woodward Avenue every 60 seconds at peak times. Wartime restrictions on vital war materials such as rubber and gasoline caused particularly heavy use of the streetcar system during the 1940s. However, between the end of the war and 1949, the city discontinued half of its 20 streetcar lines. Five more were discontinued in 1951 — three of them switched abruptly to bus lines during a DSR strike. More closings followed until August 1955, when Mayor Albert Cobo, who promoted freeway construction as the way of the future, urged the city council to sell the city's recently purchased fleet of modern streetcars to Mexico City. It was a controversial move. A newspaper poll showed that Detroiters, by a margin of 3-to-1, opposed the switch to buses. Some even jeered the sunken freeways Cobo championed, dubbing them "Cobo canals". "A lot of people were against the decision ... A common complaint was about the sale of the [new] cars, that the city didn't get its money's worth. Of course, the city had an answer for anything." On April 8, 1956, the last streetcar in Detroit rolled down Woodward Avenue. After less than 10 years in service, Detroit's fleet of streamlined streetcars was loaded on railcars and shipped to Mexico City, where they ran for another 30 years.

The Hudson's department store, the second largest in the nation, realized that the limited parking space at its downtown skyscraper would increasingly be a problem for its customers. The solution in 1954 was to open the Northland Center in nearby Southfield, just beyond the city limits. It was the largest suburban shopping center in the world and quickly became the main shopping destination for northern and western Detroit, and for much of the suburbs. By 1961, the downtown skyscraper accounted for only half of Hudson's sales; it closed in 1986. The Hudson's name would latter be discarded all together. The remaining Hudsons were first rebranded as branches of Chicago's flagship Marshall Field's State Street, and later rebranded again as branches of New York City's flagship Macy's Herald Square.

Ethnic whites enjoyed high wages and suburban life styles. Blacks comprised 4% of the auto labor force in 1942, 15% by the war's end; they held their own and were at 16% by 1960. They started in unskilled jobs, making them susceptible to layoffs and to replacement when automation came. The powerful United Auto Workers union championed state and federal civil rights legislation, but was in no hurry to advance blacks in the union hierarchy. a large well-paid middle class black community emerged; like their white counterparts, they wanted to own single family homes, fought for respectability, and left the blight and crime of the slums as fast as possible for outlying districts and suburbs.

By 1945, Detroit was running out of space for new factories; tight-knit home-owning neighborhoods rejected the notion of tearing out housing to make room for factories. There was plenty of space in the suburbs, and that is where the factories had to locate. The proposals of liberal UAW leaders such as Walter Reuther for urban redevelopment did not please the UAW's largely white, conservative membership. The members repeatedly voted for conservative mayoral candidates, such as Republicans Albert Cobo (mayor 1950-57) and Louis Miriani (mayor 1957-62), for they protected white neighborhoods from residential integration. Home ownership was not just a very large financial investment for individuals, it was also a source of identity for men who remembered the hardships and foreclosures of the Great Depression. Sugrue says, "Economically vulnerable homeowners feared, above all, that an influx of blacks would imperil their precarious investments."

As mayor in 1957–62, Louis Miriani was best known for completing many of the large-scale urban renewal projects initiated by the Cobo administration. These were largely financed by federal money, due to his rejection of implementing a city tax. Miriani also took strong measures to overcome the growing crime rate in Detroit. The United Automobile Workers (UAW), then at the height of its size and power, officially endorsed Miriani for re-election, stressing what they viewed as his conservative "law and order" position. However, while some African Americans praised Miriani for helping to break down racial divides, other disagreed with the UAW that Miriani did enough.

Historian David Maraniss cites milestones in 1962-64 that marked the city's sharp decline: the failure of a plan to host the Olympics; urban renewal uprooting black neighborhoods; urgently needed police reforms that stalled; and the failure to transform Detroit through the Model Cities and War on Poverty programs. Tensions started building that exploded in the 1967 riot, the most costly and violent in the country during a summer of numerous riots in cities.

The 1970s brought a worldwide energy crisis with high gasoline prices. For the first time, the American industry faced serious competition from imported automobiles, which were smaller and more fuel-efficient. German Volkswagens and Japanese Toyotas posed a growing threat.

Civil rights and the Great Society

In June 1963, Rev. Martin Luther King Jr. gave a major speech in Detroit that foreshadowed his "I Have a Dream" speech two months later. In Detroit, King was accompanied by Rev. C. L. Franklin. Detroit played a major role in the civil rights movement of the 1960s; the Model Cities Program was a key component of President Lyndon B. Johnson's Great Society and War on Poverty. Begun in 1966, it operated five-year-long experiments in 150 cities to develop new anti-poverty programs and alternative forms of municipal government. The ambitious federal urban aid program succeeded in fostering a new generation of mostly black urban leaders.

Detroit had one of the larger Model Cities projects. It promised a great deal and delivered much less, as Detroit suffered from the unintended consequences. Mayor Jerome Cavanagh (Mayor 1962—69) was the only elected official to serve on Johnson's task force. Detroit received widespread acclaim for its leadership in the program, which used $490 million to try to turn a nine-square-mile section of the city (with 134,000 inhabitants) into a model city. The city's political and business elite, and city planners, along with the black middle class, wanted the federal funding to assist the economic growth of the entire city. They sought to protect the central business district property values from nearby slums and to construct new revenue-generating structures. But, local community organizers and civil rights activists rallied poor residents in opposition to these plans. They said federal renewal funding should be used to replace deteriorating housing stock, whether with new public housing or low-cost housing built by private developers. The Model City program was terminated in Detroit and nationwide in 1974 after major race riots in the late 1960s most of its target cities.

Detroit witnessed growing confrontations between the mostly white police force and inner city blacks, culminating in the massive 12th Street riot in July 1967. The riot erupted in mostly black neighborhoods. Governor George W. Romney ordered the Michigan National Guard into Detroit, and President Johnson sent in U.S. Army troops. The result was 43 dead, 467 injured, over 7,200 arrests, and more than 2,000 buildings destroyed. Thousands of small businesses closed permanently or relocated to safer neighborhoods, and the affected district lay in ruins for decades.

Coleman Young, Detroit's first black mayor, explained the long-term effects of the riot:

The heaviest casualty, however, was the city. Detroit's losses went a hell of a lot deeper than the immediate toll of lives and buildings. The riot put Detroit on the fast track to economic desolation, mugging the city and making off with incalculable value in jobs, earnings taxes, corporate taxes, retail dollars, sales taxes, mortgages, interest, property taxes, development dollars, investment dollars, tourism dollars, and plain damn money. The money was carried out in the pockets of the businesses and the white people who fled as fast as they could. The white exodus from Detroit had been prodigiously steady prior to the riot, totally twenty-two thousand in 1966, but afterwards it was frantic. In 1967, with less than half the year remaining after the summer explosion—the outward population migration reached sixty-seven thousand. In 1968 the figure hit eighty-thousand, followed by forty-six thousand in 1969.

Scholars have produced many studies documenting the fall of Detroit from one of the world's premier industrial cities in 1945 to a much smaller, weaker city in the 21st century, struggling to survive against the loss of industry and population, against crime, corruption and poverty. Boyle also blames the big corporations. He summarizes the scholarly consensus in 2001:

Detroit was betrayed by a lack of political vision, torn asunder by racial conflict, and devastated by deindustrialization. Detroit's problems peaked in the late 1960s and the 1970s. Since then the city has struggled to recover, to build a new economy and a new polity. However noble the goals, though, these efforts have failed to reverse Detroit's deterioration. Motown remains in the grip of the crisis that began fifty years ago.

Milliken v. Bradley
On August 18, 1970, the NAACP filed suit against Michigan state officials, including Governor William Milliken, charging de facto public school segregation. The trial began April 6, 1971, and lasted 41 days. The NAACP argued that although schools were not legally segregated, the city of Detroit and its surrounding counties had enacted policies to maintain racial segregation in public schools. The NAACP also suggested a direct relationship between unfair housing practices (such as redlining of certain neighborhoods) and educational segregation, which followed segregated neighborhoods. District Judge Steven J. Roth held all levels of government accountable for the segregation in his ruling on Milliken v. Bradley. The Sixth Circuit Court affirmed some of the decision, withholding judgment on the relationship of housing inequality with education. The court specified that it was the state's responsibility to integrate across the segregated metropolitan area.

The governor and other accused officials appealed the decision to the U.S. Supreme Court, which took up the case February 27, 1974. The subsequent Milliken v. Bradley decision had wide national influence. In a narrow decision, the Court found that schools were a subject of local control and that suburbs could not be forced to solve problems in the city's school district. According to Gary Orfield and Susan E. Eaton in their 1996 book Dismantling Desegregation, the "Supreme Court's failure to examine the housing underpinnings of metropolitan segregation" in Milliken made desegregation "almost impossible" in northern metropolitan areas. "Suburbs were protected from desegregation by the courts ignoring the origin of their racially segregated housing patterns." "Milliken was perhaps the greatest missed opportunity of that period", said Myron Orfield, professor of law and director of the Institute on Metropolitan Opportunity at the University of Minnesota. "Had that gone the other way, it would have opened the door to fixing nearly all of Detroit's current problems."

John Mogk, a professor of law and an expert in urban planning at Wayne State University in Detroit, says, "Everybody thinks that it was the riots [in 1967] that caused the white families to leave. Some people were leaving at that time but, really, it was after Milliken that you saw mass flight to the suburbs. If the case had gone the other way, it is likely that Detroit would not have experienced the steep decline in its tax base that has occurred since then."

Supreme Justice William O. Douglas' dissenting opinion in Miliken held that

there is, so far as the school cases go, no constitutional difference between de facto and de jure segregation. Each school board performs state action for Fourteenth Amendment purposes when it draws the lines that confine it to a given area, when it builds schools at particular sites, or when it allocates students. The creation of the school districts in Metropolitan Detroit either maintained existing segregation or caused additional segregation. Restrictive covenants maintained by state action or inaction build black ghettos ... the task of equity is to provide a unitary system for the affected area where, as here, the State washes its hands of its own creations.

1970s and 1980s 

While 55 percent of Detroiters were counted as white in the 1970 census, by 1980 the city's proportion of white residents had declined to 34 percent of the population. The population shift was even more stark considering that Detroit was 83 percent white at the time of the city's all-time population high in 1950. The migration of whites to the suburbs left blacks in control of a city suffering from an inadequate tax base, and too few jobs. According to Chafets, "Among the nation's major cities, Detroit was at or near the top of unemployment, poverty per capita, and infant mortality throughout the 1980s."

In the 1973 mayoral election the polarization was nearly total, as 92% of blacks voted for Coleman Young, while 91% of the whites voted for former police Commissioner John Nichols, although neither appealed to racial issues during the campaign. Although Young had emerged from the far left element in Detroit, he moved to the right after his election. He called an ideological truce and won the support of Detroit's economic elite. The new mayor was energetic in the construction of the Joe Louis Arena, and upgrading the city's mediocre mass transit system. Highly controversial was his using eminent domain to purchase and raze a 465-acre inner-city neighborhood known as Poletown that was home to 3,500 people, mostly Polish property owners, in order to make way for a half-billion dollar General Motors Cadillac assembly plant. Rich argues that he pulled money out of the neighborhood to rehabilitate the downtown business district, because "there were no other options." Young tried to rein in the city's largely white police department, and its aggressive tactics angered black voters.

Young was an outspoken advocate for federal funding for Detroit construction projects, and his administration saw the completion of the Renaissance Center, Detroit People Mover, and several other Detroit landmarks. During Young's last two terms there he faced angry opposition from neighborhood activists. He usually prevailed, winning re-election by wide margins in 1977, 1981, 1985, and 1989, for a total of 20 years as mayor, based largely on black votes.

On August 16, 1987, Northwest Airlines Flight 255 crashed near Detroit, killing all but one of the 155 people on board, as well as two people on the ground.

Crime
Young was blamed for failing to stem the crime epidemic that Detroit became notorious for in the 1970s and 1980s. Dozens of violent black street gangs gained control of the city's large drug trade, which began with the heroin epidemic of the 1970s and grew into the even larger crack cocaine epidemic of the 1980s and early 1990s. There were numerous major criminal gangs that were founded in Detroit and dominated the drug trade at various times; most were short-lived. They included The Errol Flynns (east side), Nasty Flynns (later the NF Bangers) and Black Killers and the drug consortiums of the 1980s such as Young Boys Inc., Pony Down, Best Friends, Black Mafia Family and the Chambers Brothers. The Young Boys were innovative, opening franchises in other cities, using youth too young to be prosecuted, promoting brand names, and unleashing extreme brutality to frighten away rivals.

Several times during Young's tenure Detroit was named the arson capital of the U.S., and repeatedly the murder capital of the United States. Often Detroit was listed by FBI crime statistics as the "most dangerous city in America" during his administration. Crime rates in Detroit peaked in 1991 at more than 2,700 violent crimes per 100,000 people.
However, crime continued to be a problem in Detroit long after Young's tenure as mayor ended; according to national statistics the arson rate in Detroit was 6.3 times the national average in 2003 and the murder rate was 5.1 times the national average. In addition, the majority of Detroit residents, including many blacks, have left the city, leaving a glut of abandoned buildings that have become magnets for drugs, arson, and other crime.

The night of October 30 (the night before Halloween) was a traditional day for pranks but became known as "Devil's Night" as Detroit youth went on a rampage in the 1980s. A tradition of light-hearted minor vandalism, such as soaping windows, had emerged in the 1930s, but by the 1980s it had become, said Mayor Coleman, "a vision from hell." The arson primarily took place in the inner city, but surrounding suburbs were often affected as well. The crimes became increasingly more destructive. Over 800 fires were set in the peak year 1984, overwhelming the city's fire department. Hundreds of vacant homes across the city were set ablaze by arsonists. The fires continued to happen but the number was sharply reduced by razing thousands of abandoned houses that often were used to sell drugs as well—5,000 in 1989-90 alone. Every year the city mobilizes "Angel's Night", with tens of thousands of volunteers patrolling areas at high risk .

Decline of Detroit

The city of Detroit, in the U.S. state of Michigan, has gone through a major economic and demographic decline in recent decades. The population of the city has fallen from a high of 1,850,000 in 1950 to 680,000 in 2015, removing it from the top 20 of US cities by population for the first time since 1850. Local crime rates are among the highest in the United States (even though the overall crime rate in the city has seen a decline during the 21st century), and vast areas of the city are in a state of severe urban decay. In 2013, Detroit filed the largest municipal bankruptcy case in U.S. history, which it successfully exited on December 10, 2014.

 median household income is rising, and criminal activity is decreasing by 5% annually as of 2017.

Contributors to decline

The deindustrialization of Detroit has been a major factor in the population decline of the city.

Role of the automobile industry
Before the advent of the automobile, Detroit was a small, compact regional manufacturing center. In 1900, Detroit had a population of 285,000 people, making it the thirteenth-largest city in the U.S. Over the following decades, the growth of the automobile industry, including affiliated activities such as parts and tooling manufacturing, came to dwarf all other manufacturing in the city. The industry drew a million new residents to the city. At Ford Motor's iconic and enormous River Rouge plant alone, opened in 1927 in Detroit's neighbor Dearborn, there were over 90,000 workers. The shifting nature of the workforce stimulated by the rapid growth of the auto industry had an important impact on the city's future development. The new workers came from diverse and soon far-flung places. Nearby Canada was important early on and many other workers came from eastern and southern Europe, a large portion of them being ethnic Italians, Hungarians, and Poles. An important attraction for these workers was that the new assembly line techniques required little prior training or education to get a job in the industry.

The breadth of sources for the growing demand for auto assembly workers, however, was sharply limited by the turmoil of World War I, and shortly thereafter by the restrictive U.S. Immigration Act of 1924, with its limited annual quotas for new immigrants. In response, the industry—with Ford in the forefront—turned in a significant way to hiring African-Americans, who were leaving the South in huge numbers in response to the combination of a post-war agricultural slump and continuing Jim Crow practices. By 1930 Detroit's population had grown to nearly 1.6 million, and then to nearly 2 million by its peak shortly before 1950. A World War II boom in the manufacture of war materiel contributed to this growth surge. This population was, however, very spread out in comparison with other U.S. industrial cities. A variety of factors associated with the auto industry fed this trend. There was the large influx of workers. They earned comparatively high wages in the auto industry. The plants they worked at, belonging to various major and minor manufacturers, were spread around the city. The workers tended to live along extended bus and streetcar lines leading to their workplaces. The result of these influences, beginning already by the 1920s, was that many workers bought or built their own single-family or duplex homes. They did not tend to live in large apartment houses, as in New York, or in closely spaced row houses as in Philadelphia. After New Deal labor legislation, high auto-union secured wages and benefits facilitated this willingness to take on the cost and risk of home ownership.

These decentralizing trends did not have equal effects on African-American residents of the city. Black Detroiters tended to have far less access to New Deal mortgage support programs such as Federal Housing Authority and Veterans Administration insured mortgages. African-American neighborhoods were viewed by lenders and the federal programs as riskier, resulting—in this period—in much lower rates of homeownership for African-Americans than other residents of the city.

The auto industry also gave rise to a large number of high paying management and executive jobs. There were also large numbers of attorneys, advertisers, and other workers who supported the industry's managerial force. These workers already by the 1920s had begun to move to neighborhoods well removed from the industry's factories and higher crime rates. This upper stratum moved to outlying neighborhoods, and further, to well-to-do suburbs such as Bloomfield Hills and Grosse Pointe. Oakland County, north of the city, became a popular place to live for executives in the industry. "By the second half of the twentieth century, it was one of the wealthiest counties in the United States, a place profoundly shaped by the concentration of auto-industry-derived wealth."

Public policy was automobile oriented. Funds were directed to the building of expressways for automobile traffic, to the detriment of public transit and the inner-city neighborhoods through which the expressways were cut to get to the auto factories and the downtown office buildings.

These processes, in which the growth of the auto industry had played such a large part, combined with racial segregation to give Detroit, by 1960, its particularly noteworthy character of a substantially African-American inner city surrounded by mainly white outer sections of the city and suburbs. By 1960 there were more whites living in the city's suburbs than the city itself. On the other hand, there were very few African-Americans in the suburbs. Real estate agents would not sell to them, and if African-Americans did try to move into suburbs there was "intense hostility and often violence" in reaction.

The auto industry too was decentralizing away from Detroit proper. This change was facilitated by the great concentration of automobile production into the hands of the "Big Three" of General Motors, Ford, and Chrysler. The Big Three were able to build cars better and cheaper and put nearly every smaller competitor automaker out of business. While this corporate concentration was taking place, the Big Three were shifting their production out of central Detroit to escape the auto-union wage requirements. Between 1945 and 1957 the Big Three built 25 new manufacturing plants in the metropolitan area, not one of them in the city itself.

The number and character of these new, suburban auto factories was a harbinger of future trends detrimental to the economic health of Detroit. There was an interaction between factory decentralization and the nature of the industry's post-New Deal unionized labor force. Ford Motor was one of the first to undertake major decentralization, in reaction to labor developments. Ford's workers voted to join the UAW in 1941. This led Ford to be concerned about the vulnerability of its huge flagship Rouge River plant to labor unrest. The workers at this plant were "among the industry's most well-organized, racially and ethnically diverse, and militant". A strike at this key plant could bring the company's manufacturing operations as a whole to a halt. Ford therefore decentralized operations from this plant, to soften union power (and to introduce new technologies in new plants, and expand to new markets). Ford often built up parallel production facilities, making the same products, so that the effect of a strike at any one facility would be lessened. The results for the River Rouge plant are striking. From its peak labor force of 90,000 around 1930, the number of workers there declined to 30,000 by 1960 and only about 6,000 by 1990. This decline was mainly due to labor movement to non-union areas and automation.

The spread of the auto industry outward from Detroit proper in the 1950s was the beginning of a process that extended much further afield.The major auto plants left in Detroit were closed down, and their workers increasingly left behind. When the auto industry's facilities moved out, there were dramatically adverse economic ripple effects on the city. The neighborhood businesses that had catered to auto workers shut down. This direct and indirect economic contraction caused the city to lose property taxes, wage taxes, and population (and thus consumer demand). The closed auto plants were also often abandoned in a period before strong environmental regulation, causing the sites to become so-called "brownfields", unattractive to potential replacement businesses because of the pollution hangover from decades of industrial production. The pattern of the deteriorating city by the mid-1960s was visibly associated with the largely departed auto industry. The neighborhoods with the most closed stores, vacant houses, and abandoned lots were in what had formerly been the most heavily populated parts of the city, adjacent to the now-closed older major auto plants.

By the 1970s and 1980s, the auto industry suffered setbacks that further impacted Detroit. The industry encountered the rise of OPEC and the resulting sharp increase in gasoline prices. It faced new and intense international competition, particularly from Italian, Japanese and German automobile manufacturers. Chrysler avoided bankruptcy in the late 1970s only with the aid of a federal bailout. GM and Ford also struggled financially. It also relocated ever more of its manufacturing to lower-cost states in the U.S. and to low-income countries. Detroit's residents thus had access to fewer and fewer well-paying, secure auto manufacturing jobs.

The leadership of Detroit failed to diversify the city's industry beyond automotive manufacturers and related industries. Because the city had flourished in the heyday of the auto industry, local politicians made periodic attempts to stimulate a revival of the auto industry in the city. For example, in the 1980s the cities of Detroit and Hamtramck used the power of eminent domain to level part of what had been Poletown to make a parking lot for a new automobile factory. On that site, a new, low-rise suburban type Cadillac plant was built, with substantial government subsidies. The new Detroit/Hamtramck Assembly employs 1,600 workers. In the 1990s, the city subsidized the building of a new Chrysler plant on the city's east side, Jefferson North Assembly, which employs 4,600 people. In 2009 Chrysler filed a Chapter 11 bankruptcy case, and survives in a partnership with Fiat of Italy. while GM filed for Chapter 11 bankruptcy on June 1, 2009, and survives as a much smaller company—smaller now than Japan's Toyota Motor Corporation. A little over two years after these major blows to the U.S. auto industry, the city itself went into Chapter 9 bankruptcy after years of mismanagement by local leaders.

A history of residential segregation by race

During World War Two, wartime manufacturing expanded urban employment for Black job seekers who were historically underrepresented in Detroit's labor market as labor policies sanctioned hiring discrimination. Despite the expansion of employment available to Black Detroiters, racial integration within the workplace was met with fierce opposition from Blue-collar white employees. For these white Detroiters, Black employment harbored intense housing competition within Detroit's overcrowded neighborhoods in addition to crumbling the economic stability of Detroit's white middle class. Therefore, as racial integration within the workplace alluded to racially fluid neighborhoods, the white middle class engaged in residential segregation by using discriminatory behavior and policy to regulate Black residential agency and accessibility to homeownership.

Transitioning into the postwar period, the economic hardships of manufacturing industries, stemming from suburbanization, along with overpriced rental housing forced urban Black communities to fall on hard times, devolving into decrepit remnants of Detroit's industrial surgency and booming wartime economy. The mass migration of hopeful Blacks from the Jim Crow-perpetuated racism and segregation of the South into Northern neighborhoods coupled with sluggish housing construction flooded Detroit with overpopulation, limited funding, and residential mistreatment. Black families faced large down payments, high-interest land contracts, and high maintenance costs of living facilities. The disparate treatment of Black families by landlords remained absent from the political agendas of elected Detroit leaders such as Albert Cobo who defended the rights of landlords to operate their properties as they saw fit. Given the decentralization of manufacturing, terrible living conditions, and overpopulation, many Black Detroiters sought occupancy in more resourceful middle-class neighborhoods, but found it was not an easy process.

During the Roosevelt administration, the New Deal molded the urban landscape as a battleground of interracial hostility and residential segregation. New Deal policy sought to expand homeownership for low-income residents through the construction of federally subsidized public housing. For many Americans, homeownership symbolized responsible citizenship, financial investment, and social prestige, all of which were signs of upward mobility and middle-class status. However, the economic intervention of the federal government in expanding affordable housing presented a fundamental disconnect between New Deal policy and Black homeownership. This disconnect remained ingrained in the racist and classist ideologies of the white middle class that viewed public housing as a taxpayer-handout for the poor while foreseeing severe depreciation of single-family homes within neighborhoods that were the sites of public housing construction. Consequently, independent homeowners inhibited the construction of New Deal sponsored public housing by using civic disorder and rioting as political tools to consolidate homeowner rejection of Black occupancy in middle-class neighborhoods. Consequently, the political dominance white homeowners assumed in Detroit's housing disputes encouraged the Detroit Housing Commission (DHC) to establish racist policy such as the continuation of racial segregation within Detroit's housing market, allowing the DHC to avoid the racial bloodshed of public housing construction.
 
Additionally, New Deal policy promoted the formation of private-public partnerships to manage the allocation of federal funds within local municipalities. These private-public partnerships established residential segregation through a tactic called redlining, which restricted the movement of Black Detroiters into middle-class neighborhoods. In particular, the Federal Housing Administration (FHA) and the Home Owners Loan Corporation (HOLC) effectively marked the racial boundaries of Detroit to determine the actuarial soundness of urban neighborhoods. Therefore, redlining governed the dispersal of federal loans and subsidies on the basis of the racial composition of a neighborhood. Local real estate brokers and lenders refused to allocate federal funds to predominantly Black communities such as Paradise Valley along with neighborhoods that had only a handful of Black residents as these areas were all categorized as unfit and hazardous investments for mortgages. By preventing Blacks from the ability to attain mortgage loans from local banks, the New Deal private-public partnerships used redlining to protect the property values and investment opportunities for white middle-class homes. Therefore, redlining circumscribed Black homeownership in middle-class neighborhoods through the spatial and social isolation of Black Detroiters in Detroit's expanding ghettos. Simultaneously, this residential segregation also exacerbated the economic instability of Black Detroiters as these residents were forced to succumb to deteriorating housing without appreciating assets while the high rates of unemployment of Black Detroiters made them exceedingly vulnerable to losing their homes through eviction or tax foreclosure.

Because the local government had the final say over the distribution of federal funds for home loan eligibility, there were no major alternatives for obtaining loans for a new home, which further promoted the precarious and unstable living conditions of Black Detroiters. The redemptive capacity of the private-public partnership between local Detroit banks and the FHA-HOLC funneled a vicious territorialism of the white middle class that upheld the high property values of white neighborhoods by unequivocally suppressing the upward mobility of Black Detroiters. Collectively, Black integration into white neighborhoods greatly depreciated property values, which further motivated white Detroiters to keep their neighborhoods segregated. Despite the creation of an affordable housing agenda that was rooted in liberal thought, Roosevelt's New Deal underhandedly restricted the residential agency of Black Detroiters. Predicated upon a de jure system of residential segregation, New Deal policy remained tethered to the governmental imposition of societal and policy discrimination that aggravated structures of racism within Detroit's fractured housing market. In the unfolding of the housing crisis within Detroit, the federal government perpetuated the marginalization of Black Detroiters by neglecting the jarring racism and segregation that New Deal policy produced.

The theories of eugenics and racial inferiority that dictated FHA policymaking certainly translated into the FHA's subsidization of Black homeownership upon the cessation of redlining. During an era of racial liberalism, the FHA's colorblindness and no redlining policy failed to reverse the cumulative effects of structural racism. In response to the prolonged refusal of mortgages for African Americans, the FHA passed the 1968 Housing and Urban Development Act (HUD) to encourage low-income homeownership through low-interest mortgage loans with the full financial backing of the federal government. FHA-HUD policy guaranteed that pay lenders would be compensated in full for the mortgage of foreclosed homes and by creating a housing market dominated by mortgage bankers, the FHA incentivized mortgage bankers to drive desperate Black families to low-income homeownership, allowing bankers to inflate their economic gains by cycling these Black families through tax foreclosures. Therefore, this racist and predatory provision of low-income housing through FHA-HUD policy elucidates that federal government was an inevitable perpetrator of racial segregation within Detroit's housing market. Despite having access to mortgage loans, Black Detroiters continued to be preyed upon by real estate bankers who earned tremendous profits from the inability of Black Detroiters to keep up with the FHA-insured mortgage payments. For many Black Detroiters, the dismissal of FHA redlining did not signal an end to the economic exploitation and residential segregation of Black families at the hands of wealth-hungry bankers and lenders. Colorblind universalism within Detroit's housing market remained a far-fetched aspiration of Black families in their pursuit of homeownership as FHA-HUD policy failed to systematically dismantle the segregative impulses of the real estate industry.

Furthermore, the threat of racial integration in white communities facilitated the rise of neighborhood associations, which were coalitions of independent white homeowners that fervently protected homeownership rights through advocacy for residential segregation. Frequently, neighborhood associations relied on restrictive covenants to mandate legal barriers to Black homeownership in middle-class neighborhoods to avoid the radical disinvestment that would stem from a racially integrated neighborhood. During the legality of restrictive covenants, these deed restrictions were explicitly racist and took the form of; "people of color can't purchase this home", or only for the "Caucasian race". By leveraging the legally discriminatory capacity of restrictive covenants, neighborhood associations prioritized the stability of homeownership through the preservation of neighborhood investment and relatively high single-family home values. The homogenization of the economic and social fabric of middle-class neighborhoods reflected the white-afflicted segregation of Black Detroiters that confined these residents to Detroit's oldest and worst housing stock. However, in the midst of a mid-twentieth century movement for civil rights reform, certain hallmark legal cases of discrimination in housing such as Shelley vs Kraemer deemed restrictive covenants unconstitutional. Upon this Supreme Court ruling, neighborhood associations were forced to change their restrictive zoning regulations as Black Detroiters began moving out of the dilapidated Detroit ghetto and sought residency in middle-class neighborhoods. Therefore, the repealing of restrictive covenants resulted in neighborhood associations relying on extralegal subversions of restrictive covenants to alternatively stunt Black residential integration. For example, neighborhood associations amended housing contracts to now contain phrases such as "undesirable" rather than "Black" to avoid the explicit discrimination of housing based on race. These slight revisions in already racist housing contracts allowed neighborhood associations to remain legally immune during the discriminatory protection of middle-class homeownership from the perceived social disorder and housing depreciation of racially integrated neighborhoods. Therefore, throughout the history of restrictive covenants, the preservation of the social and economic stability of middle-class neighborhoods hardened the residential segregation of Black Detroiters by placing restrictions on Black homeownership. Overall, restrictive covenants reinforced unequal race relations and perpetuated racial divisions that continue to exacerbate the urban inequality of current-day Detroit.

Coupled with the ability of de jure discrimination to mandate residential segregation through policy, neighborhood associations curbed civil rights reform that sought to mitigate racism within housing. The middle-class mentality of neighborhood associations would govern the political climate of Detroit as this anti-integration constituency resonated with politicians who would dispel public housing and the threat of racial invasion. The 1949 mayoral election of Detroit pitted George Edwards, a UAW activist and public housing advocate, against Albert Cobo, a corporate executive and real estate investor. Cobo presented an unwavering distrust of government economic intervention and pledged to protect single-family home investment through the disapproval of federally funded public housing projects within Detroit. Therefore, the anti-public housing and pro-homeownership sentiment of Albert Cobo garnered immense support from neighborhood associations that served an indispensable role in the overwhelming victory of Cobo over Edwards for mayor of Detroit.

A staunch opponent of integrated housing, mayor Cobo restructured the Mayor's Interracial Committee (MIC), a large advocate group for housing equality and civil rights reform, into the Commission on Community Relations (CCR) that more closely aligned to the anti-civil rights and segregationist political identity of neighborhood associations. Additionally, Cobo enacted residential segregation and racism through DHC policy while vetoing public housing development within white neighborhoods, thus further debilitating the limited accessibility Black Detroiters had affordable housing. During Cobo's mayorship, neighborhood associations held political power within Detroit as the unregulated local government allowed for these inherently racist associations to dictate residential zoning and city planning that further strengthened the residential segregation of Black Detroiters. Evidently, Cobo's political regime displayed de facto segregation through the political mobilization of neighborhood associations and the private real-estate industry. However, the series of events that led to Cobo's mayorship remained direct reflections of the violence launched on Black Detroiters from de jure segregation through decades of racist and classist housing policies that bled urban neighborhoods of the most basic living conditions while hardening Detroit's racial divide.

The systematic exclusion of Black families from homeownership generationally suppressed Black Detroiters from receiving the economic assets of homeownership such as stable education, retirement, and businesses opportunities, which have created greater degrees of residential instability and precariousness. Overall, Detroit's convoluted history of segregation reveals that homeownership should not be viewed as a means to overcome poverty as exploitative market dynamics and racist housing policy eradicate the dimension of impartiality within the United States housing market.

The open housing movement
In 1948, Shelley v. Kraemer and three other United States Supreme Court cases established that state enforcement of racially restrictive covenants were unconstitutional. This decision revitalized the advocacy for integrated neighborhoods. Suburbs around Detroit expanded dramatically as wealthy African-Americans began to move into white neighborhoods. The singular asset that many white residents held after World War II was their home, and they feared that if Black people moved in, the value of their homes would plummet. This fear was preyed upon by blockbusting real estate agents who would manipulate Whites into selling their homes for cheap prices by convincing them that African-Americans were infiltrating the neighborhood. They would even send Black children to go door to door with pamphlets that read, "Now is the best time to sell your house—you know that." With the means to pick up and leave, many white residents fled to the surrounding suburbs. This "white flight" took much away from the city: residents, the middle class, and tax revenues which kept up public services such as schools, police, and parks. Blockbusting agents then profited by reselling these houses at incredibly marked-up prices to African-Americans desperate to get out of the inner city.

These inflated prices were only affordable by the black "elite". As wealthier black Detroiters moved into the previously white neighborhoods, they left behind low-income residents in the most inadequate houses at the highest rental. Redlining, restrictive covenants, local politics, and the open housing movement all contributed to the restricted movement of black, low-income Detroiters.

1950s job losses 

In the postwar period, the city had lost nearly 150,000 jobs to the suburbs. Factors were a combination of changes in technology, increased automation, consolidation of the auto industry, taxation policies, the need for different kinds of manufacturing space, and the construction of the highway system that eased transportation for commuters. Major companies like Packard, Hudson, and Studebaker, as well as hundreds of smaller companies, declined significantly or went out of business entirely. In the 1950s, the unemployment rate hovered near 10 percent.

1950s to 1960s freeway construction 

By the late 1940s, the economic wounds from years of redlining and restrictive covenants hurt the standard of living for many African Americans and minorities living in Detroit. With limited housing opportunities and sky-high rents, those living in "red" neighborhoods like Black Bottom and Paradise Valley often had little financial ability to pay for private apartments or even housing repairs. Consequences of close-quarter living were exacerbated by an influx of black immigrants during the Great Migration and World War II. The decaying neighborhoods also developed sanitation problems; garbage pickups were rare and trash littered the street, accelerating the spread of diseases and enticing pests. Perceptions of "urban blight" and a need for "slum clearance" in these areas were fueled especially by (majority white) Detroit city planners, who classified over two-thirds of housing in Paradise Valley as substandard.

A plan for "urban renewal" in Black Bottom and Paradise Valley neighborhoods was put forth by Detroit Mayor Edward Jeffries in 1944. Utilizing eminent domain laws, the government began taking down buildings in the Black Bottom neighborhood in 1949. The push for urban renewal in post-World War II Detroit was popularized by local government officials, in conjunction with real estate agents and bank owners of the time, who stood to gain from investment in new buildings and wealthier residents. When the 1956 Highway Act mandated new highways routed through Detroit, the Black Bottom and Paradise Valley areas were an ideal placement; deconstruction of the site had already been started, and the political clout of slum clearance was more powerful than the limited ability residents had to advocate against the placement.

Though it faced urban poverty and overcrowding, the Black Bottom neighborhoods were an exciting mix of culture and innovation, with the economic district boasting approximately 350 black-owned businesses. The downtown area is often described as if Motown music played even from the pipes in the street. But when highway projects were announced, sometimes years before construction started and sometimes warning only thirty days in advance, the property values for those who did own land disappeared. The forced relocation condemned many residents to even harsher poverty, and the local government commissions made few efforts to assist families in relocation. It was difficult enough for the thousands of persons displaced to find new housing in a time where restrictive covenants, even though technically outlawed in 1948, were deftly and covertly written into many of Detroit's surrounding neighborhoods. It was even harder for business owners to relocate their life's work. Lasting ramifications of the highway construction are still felt by the black business sector in Detroit today.

The Oakland-Hastings Freeway, now called the I-375 Chrysler Highway, was laid directly along Hastings Street at the heart of the Black Bottom business district, and cut through the Lower East Side and Paradise Valley as well. For the construction of the Edsel Ford Expressway (I-94) alone, 2,800 buildings from the West Side and northern Paradise Valley were demolished, including former jazz nightclubs, churches, community buildings, businesses and homes. The Lower West Side was mostly destroyed by the John C. Lodge Freeway, which also ran through black neighborhoods outside of Twelfth Street and Highland Park.

A letter from a Mrs. Grace Black found in the Bentley Historical Library's historical archives illustrates the struggles of finding housing with children in the midst of highway construction:Sept 1950Governor Williams:Please consider a family of 6 who are desperately in need of a house to rent. Husband, wife, and four lonely children, who have been turned down because we have children. We are now living in a house of the Edsel Ford Express Highway. We have our notice to move on out before the 23rd of Oct. So far we haven't found a place to move. Nobody want to rent us because we have children. My children aren't destructive but nobody will give us a chance to find out if they are or not. We are so comfortable here. It's the first freedom we've enjoyed since we've had children. My husband work at children's hospital only mak $60 a week. Sixty dollars we are paying $50 a month which we don't mind because we are comfortable. This will be demolished if we were able we would buy this house. But are not. So if anything you can do will be appreciated from the depths of our hearts. You have done so much to help the lower income families. We are deeply grateful wishing you God's speed. This is urgent! Please give this your immediate consideration.Thank youMrs. Grace Black (a worried mother)

I-75, Ford Field, and Comerica Park now occupy most of the area where Paradise Valley once stood. Historian Thomas Sugrue notes that of the families displaced by the razing of the Paradise Valley neighborhood:

Detroit riots 

The Detroit Race Riot of 1943 broke out in Detroit in June of that year and lasted for three days before Federal troops regained control. The rioting between blacks and whites began on Belle Isle, Detroit's largest park, on June 20, 1943, and continued until June 22, killing 34, wounding 433, and destroying property valued at $2 million. This was one of Detroit's worst riots, with the buildup of racial tension and animosity between blacks and whites culminating in brawls that broke out on the bridge connecting Belle Isle to southeast Detroit. Fierce attacks were launched on each other's property, including the looting of both black and white-owned stores and white rampages throughout Paradise Valley, a segregated section of Detroit that was predominantly black and very poorly maintained.

As racial tensions escalated between blacks and whites, the gravity of the consequences of these tensions also escalated. Violence and riots were common, especially when regarding housing situations, as blacks began to encroach on predominantly white neighborhoods. In 1955, the black Wilson family bought a home in a white neighborhood, and soon faced vandalism and property destruction. Angry demands and threats were made at the Wilson family, harassing them to move out. Again, the Detroit police officers rarely did anything to help, choosing instead to sit in their cars nearby despite the constant harassment of the Wilsons.

The summer of 1967 saw five days of riots in Detroit. Over the period of five days, forty-three people died, of whom 33 were black and 10 white. There were 467 injured: 182 civilians, 167 Detroit police officers, 83 Detroit firefighters, 17 National Guard troops, 16 State Police officers, and three U.S. Army soldiers. In the riots, 2,509 stores were looted or burned, 388 families were rendered homeless or displaced, and 412 buildings were burned or damaged enough to be demolished. Dollar losses from arson and looting ranged from $40 million to $80 million.

Economic and social fallout of the 1967 riots 

After the riots, thousands of small businesses closed permanently or relocated to safer neighborhoods, and the affected district lay in ruins for decades.

Of the 1967 riots, politician Coleman Young, Detroit's first black mayor, wrote in 1994:

According to the economist Thomas Sowell:

However, Thomas Sugrue argues that over 20% of Detroit's adult black population was out of work in the 1950s and 1960s, along with 30% of black youth between eighteen and twenty-four.

Economist Edward L. Glaeser believes the riots were a symptom of the city's already downward trajectory:

State and local governments responded to the riot with a dramatic increase in minority hiring, including the State Police hiring blacks for the first time, and Detroit more than doubling the number of black police. The Michigan government used its reviews of contracts issued by the state to secure an increase in nonwhite employment. Between August 1967 and the end of the 1969-1970 fiscal year, minority group employment by the contracted companies increased by 21.1 percent.

In the aftermath of the riot, the Greater Detroit Board of Commerce launched a campaign to find jobs for ten thousand "previously unemployable" persons, a preponderant number of whom were black. By Oct 12, 1967, Detroit firms had reportedly hired about five thousand African-Americans since the beginning of the jobs campaign. According to Sidney Fine, "that figure may be an underestimate."

The Michigan Historical Review writes that "Just as the riots following the assassination of Martin Luther King Jr. facilitated the passage of the federal Civil Rights Act of 1968, which included fair housing, so the Detroit riot of July 1967, 'the worst racial disturbance' of the century to that time, provided the impetus for the passage of Michigan's fair housing law as well as similar measures in many Michigan communities." Other laws passed in response to the disorder included "important relocation, tenants' rights, and code enforcement legislation". Such proposals had been made by Governor Romney throughout the 1960s, but the opposition did not collapse until after the riot.

1970s and 1980s

The 1970 census showed that white people still made up a majority of Detroit's population. However, by the 1980 census, white people had fled at such a large rate that the city had gone from 55 percent to 34 percent white within a decade. The decline was even starker than this suggests, considering that when Detroit's population reached its all-time high in 1950, the city was 83 percent white.

Economist Walter E. Williams writes that the decline was sparked by the policies of Mayor Young, who Williams claims discriminated against whites. By contrast, urban affairs experts largely blame federal court decisions which decided against NAACP lawsuits and refused to challenge the legacy of housing and school segregation – particularly the case of Milliken v. Bradley, which was appealed up to the Supreme Court.

The District Court in Milliken had originally ruled that it was necessary to actively desegregate both Detroit and its suburban communities in one comprehensive program. The city was ordered to submit a "metropolitan" plan that would eventually encompass a total of fifty-four separate school districts, busing Detroit children to suburban schools and suburban children into Detroit. The Supreme Court reversed this in 1974. In his dissent, Justice William O. Douglas' argued that the majority's decision perpetuated "restrictive covenants" that "maintained ... black ghettos".

Gary Orfield and Susan E. Eaton wrote that the "Suburbs were protected from desegregation by the courts, ignoring the origin of their racially segregated housing patterns." John Mogk, an expert in urban planning at Wayne State University in Detroit, has said that "Everybody thinks that it was the riots [in 1967] that caused the white families to leave. Some people were leaving at that time but, really, it was after Milliken that you saw a mass flight to the suburbs. If the case had gone the other way, it is likely that Detroit would not have experienced the steep decline in its tax base that has occurred since then." Myron Orfield, director of the Institute on Metropolitan Opportunity at the University of Minnesota, has said:

The departure of middle-class whites left blacks in control of a city suffering from an inadequate tax base, too few jobs, and swollen welfare rolls. According to Chafets, "Among the nation's major cities, Detroit was at or near the top of unemployment, poverty per capita, and infant mortality throughout the 1980s."

Detroit became notorious for violent crime in the 1970s and 1980s. Dozens of violent black street gangs gained control of the city's large drug trade, which began with the heroin epidemic of the 1970s and grew into the larger crack cocaine epidemic of the 1980s and early 1990s. There were numerous major criminal gangs that were founded in Detroit and that dominated the drug trade at various times, though most were short-lived. They included The Errol Flynns (east side), Nasty Flynns (later the NF Bangers) and Black Killers and the drug consortiums of the 1980s such as Young Boys Inc., Pony Down, Best Friends, Black Mafia Family and the Chambers Brothers. The Young Boys were innovative, opening franchises in other cities, using youth too young to be prosecuted, promoting brand names, and unleashing extreme brutality to frighten away rivals.

Several times during the 1970s and 1980s, Detroit was named the "arson capital of America", and the city was also repeatedly dubbed the "murder capital of America". Detroit was frequently listed by FBI crime statistics as the "most dangerous city in America" during this time frame. Crime rates in Detroit peaked in 1991, at more than 2,700 violent crimes per 100,000 people. Population decline left abandoned buildings behind that became magnets for the drug trade, arson, and other criminal activity. The city's criminality has pushed tourism away from the city, and several foreign countries even issued travel warnings for the city.

Around this period, in the days of the year preceding and including Halloween, Detroit citizens went on a rampage called "Devil's Night". A tradition of light-hearted minor vandalism, such as soaping windows, had emerged in the 1930s, but by the 1980s it had become, said Mayor Young, "a vision from hell." During the height of the drug era, Detroit residents routinely set fire to houses that were known as popular drug-dealing locations, accusing the city's police of being either unwilling or unable to solve the deep problems of the city.

The arson primarily took place in the inner city, but surrounding suburbs were often affected as well. The crimes became increasingly destructive throughout this period. Over 800 fires were set, mostly to vacant houses, in the peak year 1984, overwhelming the city's fire department. In later years, the arsons continued, but the frequency of these fires was reduced by razing thousands of abandoned houses, buildings that were, in many cases, used to sell drugs. 5,000 of these buildings were razed in 1989–90 alone. Every year the city mobilizes "Angel's Night", with tens of thousands of volunteers patrolling high-risk areas in the city.

Problems

Urban decay

Detroit has experienced significant urban decay—the process in which a previously flourishing city falls into disuse and disrepair, characterized commonly by empty plots of land, abandoned, decrepit, and often vandalized buildings, high unemployment rates, and high crime rates. Detroit has become one of the most infamous examples of such cities in the United States. Abandoned residential and commercial buildings are very widespread; in 2014, 30% of residential buildings in the city were partially or fully vacant. The problem is so severe that the city has been likened to a ghost town. In the 1940s, Detroit was the fourth-largest city in the US thanks in large part to the automobile industry. Vehicle manufacturers Ford, General Motors, and Chrysler had their factories there, which made the city a source of employment for many people. In the 1950s, the industry was no longer confined to Detroit; it began to spread out when vehicle manufacturers began to move their factories elsewhere, which led to the old factories being closed and abandoned, and eventually many of them were vandalized. This was a side effect of automation and globalization.

Detroit now holds the name of "America's comeback city".

However, blight remains specifically in predominantly African American neighborhoods. A significant percentage of housing parcels in the city are vacant, with abandoned lots making up more than half of total residential lots in large portions of the city. With at least 70,000 abandoned buildings, 31,000 empty houses, and 90,000 vacant lots, Detroit has become notorious for its urban blight.

In 2010, Mayor Bing put forth a plan to bulldoze one-fourth of the city. Detroit is a metropolis that sprawls 139 square miles. In comparison, Manhattan is just over 22 square miles. The sprawling nature of the city is conducive to urban decay. The Mayor's plan was to concentrate Detroit's remaining population into certain areas to improve the delivery of essential city services, which the city has had significant difficulty providing (policing, fire protection, trash removal, snow removal, lighting, etc.). In February 2013 the Detroit Free Press reported the Mayor's plan to accelerate the program. The project has hopes "for federal funding to replicate it [the bulldozing plan] across the city to tackle Detroit's problems with tens of thousands of abandoned and blighted homes and buildings." Bing said the project aims "to right-size the city's resources to reflect its smaller population." Despite this, there is still an estimated 20 square miles of empty land within the city limits.

The average price of homes sold in Detroit in 2012 was $7,500. As of January 2013, 47 houses in Detroit were listed for $500 or less, with five properties listed for $1. Despite the extremely low price of Detroit properties, most of the properties have been on the market for more than a year as the boarded-up, abandoned houses of the city are seldom attractive to buyers. The Detroit News reported that more than half of Detroit property owners did not pay taxes in 2012, at a loss to the city of $131 million (equal to 12% of the city's general fund budget).

The first comprehensive analysis of the city's tens of thousands of abandoned and dilapidated buildings took place in the spring of 2014. It found that around 50,000 of the city's 261,000 structures were abandoned, with over 9,000 structures bearing fire damage. It further recommended the demolition of 5,000 of these structures.  

Between 2000 and 2010, Detroit lost a quarter of its population. More people left Detroit during this time—237,500—than fled New Orleans after Hurricane Katrina—140,000. However, from 2010 to 2018, Detroit saw the biggest growth in racial diversity of any city analyzed by a US news study. This is not the racial diversity most other cities experienced. Opposite of the white flight most cities experienced where whites fled cities for safer suburbs, Detroit saw an influx of white residents into the downtown and midtown areas. The Midtown and downtown areas have increasing population density while African American neighborhoods remain without good access to public services. The poverty rate of the city remains several times higher than the national average.

Population decline

Historically a major population center, Detroit has undergone a considerable reduction in population with the city losing over 60% of its population since 1950. Detroit reached its population peak in the 1950 census at over 1.8 million people, and its population has decreased in each subsequent census. As of the 2010 census, the city has just over 700,000 residents, a total loss of 61% of its 1950 population.

The vast majority of this population loss was due to the deindustrialization of Detroit that moved factories from the inner city to the suburbs. This was coupled with the phenomenon of white flight, the movement of many white families from urban areas of metro Detroit to the suburbs on the outskirts of the city. White flight was spurred on by the Great Migration, in which hundreds of thousands of blacks migrated from the South to Detroit in search of employment. This caused overcrowding in the inner city and led to racial housing segregation. Practices of redlining, mortgage discrimination, and racially restrictive covenants in Detroit further contributed to the overcrowding of certain minority groups residing in subsections of Detroit such as Black Bottom. Many of the white residents of Detroit did not wish to integrate with their black counterparts. They often chose to flee the city and reside in nicer, racially homogenous neighborhoods in the suburbs. This was also a result of an increased desire for homeownership. A report, "The Population Revolution in Detroit", published in February 1963 by Wayne State University sociologist Albert J. Mayer, suggested flight to the suburbs was grounded as much in economics as race: "Present population trends clearly demonstrate that the city is, by and large, being abandoned by all except those who suffer from relatively great ... deprivations." White families were in better positions to relocate into the suburbs, in juxtaposition with blacks who faced discrimination in home loans and in the real estate market.

Highway construction post-WWII also contributed to white flight, specifically with the construction of the Interstate Highway System. This allowed white families to easily commute to work in the city from the suburbs, and incentivized many white Detroiters to thus relocate. The construction of highways in Detroit further exacerbated the pre-existing racial segregation, as government officials built highways through areas that were seen as blighted – typically black "ghettos" – that were under-financed and under-maintained.

As a result of white flight and mass migration to the suburbs, a significant change in the racial composition of Detroit occurred. From 1950 to 2010, the black/white percentage of population went from 16.2%/83.6% to 82.7%/10.6%. Approximately 1,400,000 of the 1,600,000 white people in Detroit after World War II left the city for the suburbs. Beginning in the 1980s, for the first time in its history, Detroit was a majority black city.

This drastic racial demographic change resulted in more than a change in neighborhood appearance. It had political, social, and economic effects as well. In 1974, Detroit elected its first black mayor, Coleman Young. Coleman Young aimed to create a racially diverse cabinet and police force, half black and half white members, leading to a new face representing Detroit on the global stage.

Most importantly, however, was the negative effect that the population decline had on Detroit's economy. Following the decline in population, Detroit's tax revenue significantly decreased. The government was receiving less revenue from taxpayers residing in the city which led to more foreclosures and overall unemployment, eventually culminating in the bankruptcy of 2013.

Detroit's population continues to decline today, impacting its majority poor, black demographic the hardest. Because urban renewal, highway construction, and discriminatory loan policies contributed to white flight to the suburbs, the remaining poor, black city population to endure radical disinvestment and a lack of public services such as dilapidated schools, a lack of safety, blighted properties, and waste, contributing the reality of families living in the city today. Furthermore, Detroit has the highest property tax of any major U.S. city, which makes it difficult for many families to afford to live in the city.

White flight does appear to be reversing starting in the 1990s, with rich white families returning to the city and gentrifying areas of urban decay and blight. However, this has caused many issues with both physical and cultural displacement occurring, disproportionately impacting marginalized minority communities. Real estate development and the overall "improvement" of the city leads to increased rent in those parts of the city. Since marginalized communities tend to be more impoverished, they are not financially able to support these increased levels of rent, and therefore are physically displaced. Following physical displacement, there is also the issue of cultural displacement as gentrification causes a loss of sense of belonging, ownership, history, identity and pride associated with living in a certain place.

Data does show that Detroit's population loss is slowing. The decrease in 2017 was 2,376 residents compared to the 2016 decline of 2,770. The city has yet to rebound to the heights of population growth of the 1950s, but the decline is indeed slowing.

As of 2021 the population has declined further to 630,000

Social issues

Unemployment

According to the U.S. Department of Labor Bureau of Labor Statistics, the unemployment rate is at 8.3%, . 
In the 20th century, the unemployment rate was around 5% according to the U.S. Department of Labor's archives.

Poverty

The U.S.A. Census Bureau's Statistical Abstract of the United States: 2012 ranks Detroit first among all 71 U.S. cities for which rates were calculated in percentage of the city's population living below the poverty level. The individual rate living below the poverty level is 36.4%; the family rate is 31.3%.

Crime

Detroit has some of the highest crime rates in the United States, with a rate of 62.18 per 1,000 residents for property crimes, and 16.73 per 1,000 for violent crimes (compared to national figures of 32 per 1,000 for property crimes and 5 per 1,000 for violent crime in 2008). Detroit's murder rate was 53 per 100,000 in 2012, ten times that of New York City. A 2012 Forbes report named Detroit as the most dangerous city in the United States for the fourth year in a row. It cited FBI survey data that found that the city's metropolitan area had a significant rate of violent crimes: murder and non-negligent manslaughter, rape, robbery, and aggravated assault.

According to Detroit officials in 2007, about 65 to 70 percent of homicides in the city were drug-related. The rate of unsolved murders in the city is at roughly 70%.

City finances 

On March 1, 2013, Governor Rick Snyder announced that the state would be assuming financial control of the city. A team was chosen to review the city's finances and determine whether the appointment of an emergency manager was warranted. Two weeks later, the state's Local Emergency Financial Assistance Loan Board (ELB) appointed an emergency financial manager, Kevyn Orr. Orr released his first report in mid-May. The results were generally negative regarding Detroit's financial health. The report said that Detroit is "clearly insolvent on a cash flow basis." The report said that Detroit would finish its current budget year with a $162 million cash-flow shortfall and that the projected budget deficit was expected to reach $386 million in less than two months. The report said that costs for retiree benefits were eating up a third of Detroit's budget and that public services were suffering as Detroit's revenues and population shrink each year. The report was not intended to offer a complete blueprint for Orr's plans for fixing the crisis; more details about those plans were expected to emerge within a few months.

After several months of negotiations, Orr was ultimately unable to come to a deal with Detroit's creditors, unions, and pension boards and therefore filed for Chapter 9 bankruptcy protection in the Eastern District of Michigan U.S. Bankruptcy Court on July 18, 2013, the largest U.S. city ever to do so, with outstanding financial obligations to more than 100,000 creditors totaling approximately $18.5 billion. On December 10, 2014, Detroit successfully exited bankruptcy.

Resurgence
By the late 2010s, many observers, including The New York Times  began  pointing to an economic and cultural resurgence of Detroit. This resurgence was primarily due to private and public investment that served to revitalize the city's social and economic dynamics. Through a combination of reinvestment and revamped social policies Detroit has achieved a renewed sense of interest and serves as a model for other areas to learn how to re-energize their urban centers.

Evidence of Detroit's resurgence is most readily found in the Midtown Area and the Central Business District, which have attracted a number of high-profile investors. Most notably, Dan Gilbert has heavily invested in the acquisition and revitalization of a number of historic buildings in the Downtown area. A primary focus of private real estate investment has been to position Detroit's Central Business District as an attractive site for the investment of technology companies such as Amazon, Google, and Microsoft. Approaches to the private investment of Midtown, however, have prioritized re-establishing Midtown as the cultural and commercial center of the city. Midtown Cultural Connection's DIA Plaza Project, for instance, aims to unify the city's cultural district—which includes the Detroit Institute of Arts, Detroit Public Library, the Charles H. Wright Museum of African American History, and several other institutions—by constructing a public space that creates a sense of inclusion and harmony with the rest of the city. Public transportation within the Downtown area has also been a target for private investors, as evidenced by Quicken Loans' investment in Detroit's QLine railcar, which currently runs a  track along Woodward Avenue.

Gilbert's investment within the city is not limited to real estate; he has also assembled a security force that patrols the downtown area and monitors hundreds of security centers attached to buildings operated by his own Rock Ventures. These agents have eyes on almost every corner of downtown Detroit and coordinate public safety and monitor legal infractions in partnership with Wayne State University's private police agency and Detroit's own police force. In addition to these efforts to revitalize Detroit's social atmosphere, Gilbert and Quicken Loans have also cultivated a strong and diverse workforce within Detroit by incentivizing employees to live in Midtown and offering subsidies and loans. Through such initiatives, Gilbert has focused on "creating opportunity" for Detroiters and encouraged reinvestment within the city's economy.

However, the approach that many of these private investors have taken within the downtown area has been met with several criticisms. Many have argued that the influx of private capital into Downtown Detroit has resulted in dramatic changes to the social and socio-economic character of the city. Some claim that investors like Gilbert are converting Detroit into an oligarchical city whose redevelopment is controlled by only a few powerful figures. Residents have even referred to the downtown area as "Gilbertville" and expressed fears of physical displacement due to the increase in rent that results from such investments. Additionally, many long-time residents fear that the influx of new capital could result in their political disempowerment and that the city government will become less responsive to their needs if it is under the influence of outside investors.

Other investors, such as John Hantz, are attempting to revitalize Detroit using through another approach: urban agriculture. Unlike Gilbert, Hantz has turned his focus to the blighted neighborhoods in Detroit's residential zones. In 2008, Hantz approached Detroit's city government and proposed a plan to remove urban blight by demolishing blighted homes and planting trees to establish a large urban farm. As of 2017, Hantz farms has planted over 24,000 saplings and demolished 62 blighted structures. Still, it remains uncertain what Hantz's long-term ambitions are for the project, and many residents speculate future developments on his land.

Detroit's resurgence is also being driven by the formation of public-private-nonprofit partnerships that protect and maintain Detroit's most valuable assets. The Detroit Riverfront, for instance, is maintained and developed almost exclusively through non-profit funding in partnership with public and private enterprises. This model for economic development and revitalization has seen enormous success in Detroit, with the Detroit Riverfront Conservancy raising in excess of $23 million to revitalize and maintain riverfront assets. This model for economic development is so promising that the city has turned to similar partnership strategies to manage, maintain, and revitalize a number of other city assets.

Over the past seventy years, the city of Detroit, Michigan has experienced a dramatic reduction in its population and economic wellbeing. This decline has left countless members of the community in economic turmoil, driving many residents to fall behind on taxes and subsequently subject their homes to tax Foreclosure. Due to the overassessment of property values based on outdated appraisals, the property taxes on these homes are massively inflated, perpetuating further property foreclosure and Community displacement. These foreclosed properties are often turned over to a public auction, where many of them are purchased by wealthy investors looking to take advantage of Detroit's housing market.

Proponents of such investment argue that wealthy investors have minimized displacement by redeveloping vacant areas in which people did not reside; however, this kind of investment can have additional repercussions, beyond the physical and economic displacement of residents. In recent years, researchers have begun considering the impacts that gentrification and radical reinvestment can have on a city's culture. In the case of Detroit, they argue that private investment directly leads to a sense of "cultural displacement", causing long-time residents to lose "a sense of place and community" and "may feel like their community is less their own than it used to be." Although economic reinvestment provides jobs, opportunities, and capital for the city, opponents to this agenda assert that it is just a form of "disaster capitalism" and only benefits the wealthy without including Detroit residents who have been disproportionately marginalized and excluded from progressive efforts for decades. They further fear that rising property values and taxes in surrounding areas will have even more adverse impacts on existing populations and result in a new form of existential displacement.  

In 2015, a group of activists started a Community land trust, or CLT, to combat this Housing crisis by providing community controlled Affordable housing while simultaneously promoting economic development. The movement to implement CLTs in Detroit began with several meetings held by the Building Movement Project. Detroit's first CLT was established by a nonprofit organization named Storehouse of Hope. At this time, the organization created a Go Fund Me campaign used to purchase fifteen homes which then became a part of the Community Land Trust. The CLT works to ensure housing stability and helps residents overcome financial hardship by covering the costs of property taxes, insurance, building repairs and water bills while the residents themselves pay one third of their income in rent to the CLT. Sales caps are also placed on the properties of the CLT in order to maintain affordability for generations of future buyers.

Most of the skepticism surrounding CLTs is rooted in their reliance on external funding. As CLT organizations grow and their boards become more professionalized, they are often distanced from their original ideals of community-based land control which the organizations were founded upon. The majority of CLTs are not built upon economically self-sustaining models, so they are forced to compete for external funding. This takes away the autonomy of the CLT, as all of the power is transferred into the hands of grant funding organizations and private foundations. Some believe that this problem could be avoided if CLTs could somehow source their funding from investors within the community or from funders who share their ideals of community empowerment.

Metropolitan region

The Detroit area emerged as a major metropolitan region with construction of an extensive freeway system in the 1950s and 1960s which expanded in the ensuing decades. The 1950s, 60s, and 70s witnessed an expansion of the cultural phenomenon of U.S. muscle cars including Camaro, Mustang, and Charger. Automotive designers and business executives such as Bill Mitchell, Lee Iacocca, and John DeLorean rose to prominence for their contributions. Freeways facilitated movement throughout the region with millions of people taking up residence in the suburbs. A desire for newer housing and schools accelerated migration from the city to the suburbs. Commensurate with the shift of population and jobs to its suburbs, the city has had to adjust its role within the larger metropolitan area. Downtown Detroit has seen a resurgence in the 21st century as a business center and entertainment hub with the opening of three casino resort hotels. In 1940, the city of Detroit held about one-third of the state's population, while the metropolitan region currently holds roughly one-half of the state's population. For the 2010 census, the city of Detroit's population was 713,777, while metropolitan Detroit's combined statistical area had a population of 5,218,852. Through much of the 1990s and first decade of the 21st century, the city completed significant revitalizations. Immigration continues to play a role in the region's projected growth with the population of Detroit-Ann Arbor-Flint (CMSA) estimated to be 6,191,000 by 2025.

21st century

In the late 1980s and early 1990s, the city began to experience a revival, much of it centered in Downtown, Midtown, and New Center. After purchasing and renovating the historic Fox Theatre and Fox Office Centre in 1987, Mike Ilitch and Marian Ilitch moved Little Caesars Pizza's headquarters to Downtown Detroit. One Detroit Center (1993) arose on the city skyline. Newer downtown residents are predominantly young professionals. The city has three casino resort hotels - MGM Grand Detroit, MotorCity Casino, and Hollywood Casino - with one of the larger gaming industry markets in the U.S. New downtown stadiums Comerica Park and Ford Field were constructed for the Detroit Tigers and Detroit Lions in 2000 and 2002, respectively; this placed the Lions' stadium in the city proper for the first time since 1974. Opened in 2017 Little Caesars Arena allows the Detroit Red Wings and Detroit Pistons to have a shared home, and thus locating the Pistons' in the city proper for the first time since 1978, also making Detroit the only North American city to have all major professional sports based in its downtown. In 2008, the city witnessed grand restorations of the historic Book Cadillac Hotel and the Fort Shelby Hotel. The city has hosted major sporting events - the 2005 MLB All-Star Game, 2006 Super Bowl XL, 2006 World Series, WrestleMania 23 in 2007 and the NCAA Final Four in April 2009 - all of which prompted many improvements to the area.

The city's International Riverfront is a focus of much development which has complemented similar developments in Windsor, Ontario. In 2007, Detroit completed the first major portions of the River Walk, including miles of parks and fountains. The Renaissance Center received a major renovation in 2004. New developments and revitalizations are a mainstay in the city's plan to enhance its economy through tourism. Along the river, upscale condominiums are rising, such as Watermark Detroit. Some city limit signs, particularly on the Dearborn border say "Welcome to Detroit, The Renaissance City Founded 1701".

In 2004, Compuware established its world headquarters in downtown Detroit followed by Quicken Loans in 2010. Significant landmarks such as the Fox Theatre, Orchestra Hall Detroit Opera House, and the Gem Theater have been restored and host concerts, musicals, and plays. The Detroit Institute of Arts completed a major renovation and expansion in 2007. Many downtown centers such as Greektown, Cobo Center and Campus Martius Park, draw patrons and host activities.

In September 2008, Mayor Kwame Kilpatrick (who had served for six years) resigned following felony convictions. In 2013, Kilpatrick was convicted on 24 federal felony counts, including mail fraud, wire fraud, and racketeering, and was sentenced to 28 years in federal prison.

In July 2013, Michigan state-appointed emergency manager Kevyn Orr asked a federal judge to place the City of Detroit into bankruptcy protection.

In March 2014 the indebted Detroit Water and Sewerage Department began cutting off water to customers homes with unpaid bills over $150, or if the payment was more than 60 days overdue. As of July 15, more than 15,000 homes had been cut off.

Timeline

Keys to the city
Numerous people have been awarded the key to the city of Detroit. Some notable recipients include: 
 Sammy Davis Jr. - Entertainer (awarded 1961 by Mayor Louis Miriani )
Stevie Wonder, renowned Motown recording artist (awarded 1974 by Mayor Coleman Young)
Martha Jean Steinberg - Radio Broadcaster & Pastor
 Santa Claus - Given annually at the city's Thanksgiving Day Parade
 James Earl Jones - Actor
 Elmo - Sesame Street character
 Benjamin Carson - Neurosurgeon 
 Jerome Bettis - football star
Big Sean - Rapper based from Detroit 
 Steve Yzerman - received the key to the city after his retirement and having his Hockey jersey retired
 Mike Ilitch - businessman and sports team owner 
 Saddam Hussein - former Iraqi president, given key in 1980 in recognition of large donations to a church.

See also

 Demographic history of Detroit
 Detroit in literature
 List of films set in Detroit
 List of people from Detroit
 List of songs about Detroit
 List of tallest buildings in Detroit
 Music of Detroit
 Northern Cities Shift
 Rum-running in Windsor
 Saginaw Trail
 History of African Americans in Detroit

References

Further reading

 , narrative history
Conot, Robert. American Odyssey: A unique history of America told through the life of a great city (1974) 735pp; detailed narrative history.
Davis, Michael W. R. Detroit's Wartime Industry: Arsenal of Democracy (2007)
 DeMatteo, Arthur Edward. "Urban reform, politics, and the working class: Detroit, Toledo, and Cleveland, 1890-1922" (PhD dissertation, University of Akron; ProQuest Dissertations Publishing, 1999. 9940602).

 Doody, Colleen. Detroit's Cold War: The Origins of Postwar Conservatism (University of Illinois Press; 2013) 175 pages; Detroit as a center for an emerging American conservatism and militant anti-communism.
 Emerson, Charles. 1913: In Search of the World Before the Great War (2013) compares Detroit to 20 major world cities; pp 182–93.

 Georgakas, Dan, et al. Detroit: I Do Mind Dying: A Study in Urban Revolution (2nd ed. 1999) online edition
 George, Nelson. Where Did Our Love Go?: The Rise and Fall of the Motown Sound (2nd ed. 2007)
Holli, Melvin G. Reform in Detroit: Hazen S. Pingree and Urban Politics (1969), on 1890s
 LeDuff, Charlie. Detroit: An American Autopsy (2013)
 Maraniss, David. Once in a Great City: A Detroit Story (2015) online review on 1962-64
 Martelle, Scott. Detroit: A Biography (2012) excerpt and text search
Mirel, Jeffrey. The Rise and Fall of an Urban School System: Detroit, 1907-81 (2nd ed. 1999)

, Timeline format
 Rich, Wilbur C. Coleman Young and Detroit Politics: From Social Activist to Power Broker (1999)
 Schneider, John C. Detroit and the Problem of Order, 1830-1880: A Geography of Crime, Riot and Policing (1980) online
 Taylor, Paul. "Old Slow Town": Detroit during the Civil War (Detroit: Wayne State University Press, 2013). x, 248 pp. 
 Vachon, Paul. Forgotten Detroit. Arcadia Publishing, 2009. , 9780738560878.
, 268pp; survey

Ethnic and social history
 *Akhtar, Saima, "Immigrant Island Cities in Industrial Detroit", Journal of Urban History, 41 (March 2015), 175–92.
 Alvarado, Rudolph V., and Sonya Yvette Alvarado. Mexicans and Mexican Americans in Michigan (2003)
 Badaczewski, Dennis. Poles in Michigan (2002)
 Cantor, Judith Levin. Jews in Michigan (2001)
 Capeci Jr., Dominic J., and Martha Wilkerson. Layered Violence: The Detroit Rioters of 1943 (1991) online
 Darden, Joe T., and Richard W. Thomas, eds. Detroit: Race Riots, Racial Conflicts, and Efforts to Bridge the Racial Divide (Michigan State University Press; 2013) 346 pages; post-1967 history
 
 

 Hooker, Clarence. Life in the Shadows of the Crystal Palace, 1910-1927: Ford Workers in the Model T Era (1997) online edition
 Meier, August and Rudwick, Elliott. Black Detroit and the Rise of the UAW (1979) online edition
 Morris-Crowther, Jayne. The Political Activities of Detroit Clubwomen in the 1920s: A Challenge and a Promise (Wayne State University Press; 2013) 217 pages; covers white and black clubs
Nabeel, Abraham, and Andrew Shryock, eds. Arab Detroit: From Margin to Mainstream (2000); 629pp; analytic and personal accounts
 Rockaway, Robert A. The Jews of Detroit: From the Beginning, 1762-1914 (Wayne State University Press, 1986)
 Shaw, Todd C. Now is the Time! Detroit Black Politics and Grassroots Activism (Duke University Press, 2009)
 Schneider, John C. Detroit and the Problem of Order, 1830-1880: A Geography of Crime, Riot, and Policing (1980) online edition
 Smith, Suzanne E. Dancing in the Street: Motown and the Cultural Politics of Detroit(2001) excerpt and text search; online edition
 Sugrue, Thomas J. The Origins of the Urban Crisis: Race and Inequality in Postwar Detroit (Princeton U.P. 2005)

 Vargas, Zaragosa. Proletarians of the North: A History of Mexican Industrial Workers in Detroit and the Midwest, 1917-1933 (1999) excerpt and text search
 Vinyard, Jo Ellen. The Irish On the Urban Frontier: Nineteenth century Detroit, 1850-1880 (1976)
Vinyard, JoEllen McNergney. For Faith and Fortune: The Education of Catholic Immigrants in Detroit, 1805-1925 (1998) excerpt and text search
 Wilson, Brian. "The Spirit of the Motor City: Three Hundred Years of Religious History in Detroit", Michigan Historical Review (2001) 27#1 pp 21–56 online
 Wolcott, Victoria. Remaking Respectability: African American Women in Interwar Detroit (2001)
 Wolcott, Victoria. "Gendered Perspectives on Detroit History", Michigan Historical Review, (2001) 27#1 pp 75–91 online
 Zunz, Olivier. The Changing Face of Inequality: Urbanization, Industrial Development, and Immigrants in Detroit, 1880-1920 (2000), quantitative new social history excerpt and text search

Primary sources
 , 600pp of primary and secondary 0sources
 Holli, Melvin G, ed. Detroit (1976)
 Young, Coleman, And Lonnie Wheeler. Hard Stuff: The Autobiography of Mayor Coleman Young (1994)

Historic books
 
 
 Catlin, George B. The Story of Detroit (1923) online
 
, Google version; full text
 
 
 
 
 
 
 
 Time magazine cover stories

External links
 Detroit News, Rearview Mirror
 Detroit Historical Museums & Society
 HistoryDetroit
 Experience Detroit
 Michigan Historical Society and magazine

 
Detroit
Detroit
1701 establishments in the French colonial empire